= National Register of Historic Places listings in Adair County, Iowa =

Location of Adair County in Iowa

This is a list of the National Register of Historic Places listings in Adair County, Iowa.

This is intended to be a complete list of the properties and districts on the National Register of Historic Places in Adair County, Iowa, United States. Latitude and longitude coordinates are provided for many National Register properties and districts; these locations may be seen together in a map.

There are 10 properties and districts listed on the National Register in the county.

This National Park Service list is complete through NPS recent listings posted April 24, 2026.

== Current listings ==
| | Name on the Register | Image | Date listed | Location | City or town | Description |
|---|---|---|---|---|---|---|
| 1 | Adair County Courthouse | Adair County Courthouse | July 2, 1981 (#81000224) | Iowa Ave. and 1st St. 41°18′18″N 94°27′40″W | Greenfield | Romanesque Revival style brick courthouse built in 1891. |
| 2 | Adair County Democrat-Adair County Free Press Building | | February 7, 2011 (#10001203) | 108 E. Iowa St. 41°18′18″N 94°27′36″W | Greenfield | |
| 3 | Adair Viaduct | Adair Viaduct | June 25, 1998 (#98000775) | Business Route 80 over the Iowa Interstate Railroad tracks 41°29′50″N 94°38′36″W | Adair | A ribbed open spandrel type of arch bridge spanning 80 feet. |
| 4 | Catalpa | Catalpa | November 13, 1974 (#74000776) | In NRHP documents: "Southeast of Greenfield". Actual street address: 2773 290th Street, Orient, IA. 41°13′55″N 94°21′37″W | Greenfield | Also known as Wallace Farm, this farm was once owned by Henry Cantwell Wallace, American farmer, journalist, and political activist. |
| 5 | Chicago, Rock Island and Pacific Railroad: Stuart Passenger Station | Chicago, Rock Island and Pacific Railroad: Stuart Passenger Station | February 19, 1980 (#80001428) | Front St. 41°30′12″N 94°19′01″W | Stuart | |
| 6 | Greenfield Public Square Historic District | | September 17, 2014 (#14000623) | 102–362 Public Square, 201–215 S. 1st St., 107–110 E. Iowa St. 41°18′18″N 94°27′40″W | Greenfield | |
| 7 | Hotel Greenfield | Hotel Greenfield | November 18, 2011 (#11000812) | 110 E. Iowa St. 41°18′18″N 94°27′35″W | Greenfield | |
| 8 | Loucks Grove Church | | November 22, 1995 (#95001314) | 7 miles north of the junction of Iowa Highways 25 and 92, then 3 miles east and 1.5 miles north on an unnamed county road 41°25′30″N 94°23′40″W | Greenfield | |
| 9 | Tastee-Freez Drive In and Dairy Store | | June 16, 2025 (#100011921) | 610 SE Kent Street; 41°18′11″N 94°27′09″W | Greenfield | |
| 10 | Warren Opera House Block and Hetherington Block | Warren Opera House Block and Hetherington Block | October 18, 1979 (#79000880) | 156 Public Sq. 41°18′18″N 94°27′37″W | Greenfield | |

== See also ==
- List of National Historic Landmarks in Iowa
- National Register of Historic Places listings in Iowa
- Listings in neighboring counties: Adams, Cass, Guthrie, Madison, Union
