= 1951 Lawrence Vikings football team =

American college football season

1951 Lawrence Vikings football

MWC champion
- Conference: Midwest Conference
- Record: 7–0 (7–0 MWC)
- Head coach: Bernie Heselton (14th season)
- Home stadium: Whiting Field

1951 Midwest Conference football standings
	Conf.					Overall
Team	W		L		T	W		L		T
Lawrence $	7	–	0	–	0	7	–	0	–	0
Ripon	6	–	1	–	0	6	–	2	–	0
Knox	3	–	2	–	1	4	–	3	–	1
Carleton	3	–	3	–	0	4	–	3	–	0
Monmouth (IL)	2	–	3	–	1	3	–	3	–	2
Coe	2	–	4	–	0	3	–	5	–	0
Grinnell	1	–	5	–	0	1	–	6	–	1
Cornell (IA)	0	–	6	–	0	0	–	7	–	0
$ – Conference champion

The 1951 Lawrence Vikings football team was an American football team that represented Lawrence University as a member of the Midwest Conference (MWC) during the 1951 college football season. In their 14th year under head coach Bernie Heselton, the Vikings compiled a perfect 7–0 record (7–0 in conference games), won the MWC championship, and outscored all opponents by a total of 145 to 39. Lawrence played home games at Whiting Field in Appleton, Wisconsin.

== Schedule ==
Date	Opponent	Site	Result	Attendance	Source
September 29	at Grinnell	Grinnell, IA	W 35–0		
October 6	Knox	Whiting Field; Appleton, WI	W 19–12		
October 13	Cornell (IA)	Whiting Field; Appleton, WI	W 19–6		
October 20	Carleton^{†}	Whiting Field; Appleton, WI	W 14–7		
October 27	at Ripon	Ripon, WI (rivalry)	W 26–7		
November 3	at Monmouth (IL)	Monmouth, IL	W 7–0		
November 10	at Coe	Poe Field; Cedar Rapids, IA	W 25–7		
^{†}Homecoming
