= 1946 Midwest Conference football season =

- Sport: Football
- Teams: 9
- Champion: Lawrence

Football seasons
- 1945 1947

1946 Midwest Conference football standings
	Conf.					Overall
Team	W		L		T	W		L		T
Lawrence $	6	–	0	–	0	6	–	1	–	1
Ripon	3	–	1	–	1	4	–	3	–	1
Cornell (IA)	4	–	2	–	1	5	–	2	–	1
Carleton	3	–	2	–	0	5	–	3	–	0
Monmouth (IL)	2	–	3	–	0	4	–	4	–	0
Beloit	2	–	4	–	0	4	–	4	–	0
Grinnell	2	–	4	–	0	3	–	5	–	0
Knox	2	–	4	–	0	3	–	5	–	0
Coe	1	–	5	–	0	3	–	5	–	0
$ – Conference champion

The 1946 Midwest Conference football season was the season of college football played by the nine member schools of the Midwest Conference (MWC), formally known as the "Midwest Collegiate Athletic Conference", as part of the 1946 college football season.

The Lawrence Vikings, in their ninth season under head coach Bernie Heselton, won the MWC championship with a 6–1–1 record (6–0 against MWC opponents). Back Carl Giordana and tackle Richard Miller received first-team honors on the 1946 All-Midwest Conference football team.

The Ripon Redmen, led by head coach Carl Doehling, finished in second place with a 4–3–1 record (3–1 against MWC teams). Ripon back Ted Scalissi and guard James Callan were selected as first-team All-MWC players.

The third-place Cornell Purple compiled a 5–2–1 record and led all other teams with three players (end Charles Jacot, guard Joe Pelisek, and center Ralph Ringgenberg) selected to the All-MWC first team.

== Conference overview ==
Conf. rank	Team	Head coach	Conf. record	Overall record	Points scored	Points against
1	Lawrence	Bernie Heselton	6–0	6–1–1	217	78
2	Ripon	Carl Doehling	3–1–1	4–3–1	109	131
3	Cornell (IA)	Walt S. Koch	4–2–1	5–2–1	98	62
4	Carleton	Walter Hass	3–2	5–3	131	79
5	Monmouth (IL)	Glenn E. Robinson	2–3	4–4	104	66
6 (tie)	Grinnell	Ben Douglas	2–4	3–5	82	87
6 (tie)	Beloit	James C. Easterbrook	2–4	4–4	88	89
6 (tie)	Knox	Harold Turner	2–4	3–5	45	95
9	Coe	Harris Lamb	1–5	3–5	30	119

== Teams ==
=== Lawrence ===
1946 Lawrence Vikings football

MWC champion
- Conference: Midwest Conference
- Record: 6–1–1 (6–0 MWC)
- Head coach: Bernie Heselton (9th season)
- Home stadium: Whiting Field

The 1946 Lawrence Vikings football team represented Lawrence College (later renamed Lawrence University). In their ninth year under head coach Bernie Heselton, the Vikings compiled a 6–1–1 record (6–0 against MWC teams), won the MCAC championship, and outscored opponents by a total of 217 to 78.

Five Lawrence players received honors on the 1946 All-Midwest Conference football team: back Carl Giordana (first team); tackle Richard Miller (first team); tackle Kenneth Bahnson (second team); guard Bob McMaster (second); and end Bill Burton (second).

The team played its home games at Whiting Field in Appleton, Wisconsin.

Date	Opponent	Site	Result	Attendance	Source
September 21	at Carroll (WI)*	Waukesha, WI	L 12–13		
September 28	at DePauw*	Greencastle, IN	T 19–19		
October 5	Carleton	Whiting Field; Appleton, WI	W 34–13		
October 12	Knox	Whiting Field; Appleton, WI	W 39–0		
October 19	at Grinnell	Grinnell, IA	W 21–13		
October 26	Coe	Whiting Field; Appleton, WI	W 37–0		
November 2	Ripon^{†}	Whiting Field; Appleton, WI (rivalry)	W 34–13	5,000	
November 9	at Beloit	Strong Stadium; Beloit, WI	W 21–7	2,500	
*Non-conference game; ^{†}Homecoming

=== Ripon ===
1946 Ripon Redmen football
- Conference: Midwest Conference
- Record: 4–3–1 (3–1 MWC)
- Head coach: Carl Doehling (25th season)

The 1946 Ripon Redmen football team represented Ripon College of Ripon, Wisconsin. In their 25th year under head coach Carl Doehling, the Redmen compiled a 4–3–1 record (3–1 against MWC teams), finished in second place in the MWC, and were outscored by a total of 131 to 109.

Date	Opponent	Site	Result	Attendance	Source
September 21	at Bradley*	Peoria Stadium; Peoria, IL	L 12–19		
September 28	at Western Michigan*	Waldo Stadium; Kalamazoo, MI	L 0–47		
October 5	Cornell (IA)	Ripon, WI	T 6–6		
October 19	Beloit^{†}	Ripon, WI	W 28–19		
October 26	Monmouth (IL)^{†}	Ripon, WI	W 20–6		
November 2	at Lawrence	Appleton, WI (rivalry)	L 13–34	> 5,000	
November 9	Carroll (WI)*	Ripon, WI	W 20–0		
November 16	at Coe	Cedar Rapids, IA	W 10–0		
*Non-conference game; ^{†}Homecoming

=== Cornell ===
1946 Cornell Purple football
- Conference: Midwest Conference
- Record: 5–2–1 (4–2 MWC)
- Head coach: Walt S. Koch

The 1946 Cornell Purple football team represented Cornell College of Mount Vernon, Iowa. Led by head coach Walt S. Koch, the Purple compiled a 5–2–1 record (4–2 against MWC teams), finished in third place in the MWC, and outscored opponents by a total of 98 to 52.

Date	Opponent	Site	Result	Source
September 28	at Beloit	Beloit, WI	L 0–20	
October 5	at Ripon	Ripon, WI	T 6–6	
October 12	Simpson*	Mount Vernon, IA	W 27–0	
October 19	Coe		W 13–0	
October 26	Grinnell	Mount Vernon, IA	W 20–6	
November 2	at Knox	Galesburg, IL	W 13–0	
November 9	Monmouth (IL)	Mount Vernon, IA	W 13–6	
November 16	at Carleton	Northfield, MN	L 6–24	
*Non-conference game

=== Carleton ===
1946 Carleton Carls football
- Conference: Midwest Conference
- Record: 5–3 (3–2 MWC)
- Head coach: Walter Hass

The 1946 Carleton Carls football team represented Carleton College of Northfield, Minnesota. Led by head coach Walter Hass, the Carls compiled a 5–3 record (3–2 against MWC teams), finished in fourth place in the MWC, and outscored opponents by a total of 131 to 79.

Date	Opponent	Site	Result	Attendance	Source
September 28	Stout Institute*	Northfield, MN	W 20–6		
October 5	at Lawrence	Appleton, WI	L 13–34		
October 12	Coe	Northfield, MN	W 13–6		
October 19	at St. Olaf*	Northfield, MN	L 13–14	> 6,000	
November 2	Beloit	Northfield, MN	W 26–0		
October 26	at Macalester*	Saint Paul, MN	W 20–0		
November 9	at Grinnell	Grinnell, IA	L 2–13		
November 16	Cornell (IA)	Northfield, MN	W 24–6		
*Non-conference game

=== Monmouth ===
1946 Monmouth Fighting Scots football
- Conference: Midwest Conference
- Record: 4–4 (2–3 MWC)
- Head coach: Glenn E. Robinson

The 1946 Monmouth Fighting Scots football team represented Monmouth College of Monmouth, Illinois. Led by head coach Glenn E. Robinson, the Fighting Scots compiled a 4–4 record (2–3 against MWC teams), finished in fifth place in the MWC, and outscored opponents by a total of 104 to 66.

Date	Opponent	Site	Result	Source
September 28	Parsons*	Monmouth, IL	W 26–0	
October 5	Beloit	Monmouth, IL	L 0–6	
October 12	Grinnell	Monmouth, IL	W 12–7	
October 19	Carthage*	Monmouth, IL	W 28–0	
October 26	at Ripon	Ripon, WI	L 6–20	
November 2	Augustana (IL)*	Monmouth, IL	L 13–20	
November 9	at Cornell (IA)	Mount Vernon, IA	L 6–13	
November 16	at Knox	Galesburg, IL	W 13–0	
*Non-conference game

=== Grinnell ===
1946 Grinnell Pioneers football
- Conference: Midwest Conference
- Record: 3–5 (2–4 MWC)
- Head coach: Ben Douglas (3rd season)

The 1946 Grinnell Pioneers football team represented Grinnell College of Grinnell, Iowa. In their third, non-consecutive year under head coach Ben Douglas, the Pioneers compiled a 3–5 record (2–4 against MWC teams), finished in a tie for sixth place in the MWC, and were outscored by a total of 87 to 82.

Grinnell also celebrated the school's centennial in the fall of 1946.

Date	Opponent	Site	Result	Source
September 27	Central (IA)*	Grinell, IA	W 6–0	
October 5	at Knox	Galesburg, IL	L 9–18	
October 12	at Monmouth (IL)	Monmouth, IL	L 7–12	
October 19	Lawrence	Grinnell, IA	L 13–21	
October 26	at Cornell (IA)	Mount Vernon, IA	L 6–20	
November 2	Coe	Grinnell, IA	W 28–0	
November 9	Carleton	Grinnell, IA	W 13–2	
November 16	at Colorado College*	Washburn Field; Colorado Springs, CO	L 0–14	
*Non-conference game

=== Beloit ===
1946 Beloit Blue Devils football
- Conference: Midwest Conference
- Record: 4–4 (2–4 MWC)
- Head coach: James C. Easterbrook

The 1946 Beloit Blue Devils football team represented Beloit College of Beloit, Wisconsin. Led by head coach James C. Easterbrook, the Blue Devils compiled a 4–4 record (2–4 against MWC teams), finished in a tie for sixth place in the MWC, and were outscored by a total of 89 to 88.

The candidates for the 1946 Beloit football team included 50 veterans of World War II.

Date	Opponent	Site	Result	Source
September 28	Cornell (IA)	Beloit, WI	W 20–0	
October 5	at Monmouth (IL)	Monmouth, IL	W 6–0	
October 12	Northwestern College*		W 12–0	
October 19	Ripon	Beloit, WI	L 19–28	
October 26	Knox	Beloit, WI	L 12–14	
November 2	at Carleton	Northfield, MN	L 0–26	
November 9	Lawrence	Strong Stadium; Beloit, WI	L 7–21	
November 16	at Carroll (WI)*	Waukesha, WI	W 12–0	
*Non-conference game

=== Knox ===
1946 Knox Old Siwash football
- Conference: Midwest Conference
- Record: 3–5 (2–4 MWC)
- Head coach: Harold Turner

The 1946 Knox Old Siwash football team represented Knox College of Galesburg, Illinois. Led by head coach Harold Turner, the Old Siwash compiled a 3–5 record (2–4 against MWC teams), finished in a tie for sixth place in the MWC, and were outscored by a total of 95 to 45.

Date	Opponent	Site	Result	Source
September 2	at Dubuque*	Dubuque, IA	L 0–2	
October 5	Grinnell	Galesburg, IL	W 18–9	
October 12	at Lawrence	Appleton, WI	L 0–39	
October 19	Augustana*	Galesburg, IL	W 7–0	
October 26	at Beloit	Beloit, WI	W 14–12	
November 2	Cornell (IA)	Galesburg, IL	L 0–13	
November 9	at Coe	Cedar Rapids, IA	L 6–7	
November 16	Monmouth (IL)	Galesburg, IL	L 0–13	
*Non-conference game

=== Coe ===
1946 Coe Kohawks football
- Conference: Midwest Conference
- Record: 3–5 (1–5 MWC)
- Head coach: Harris Lamb (2nd season)

The 1946 Coe Kohawks football team represented Coe College of Cedar Rapids, Iowa. In their second season under head coach Harris Lamb, the Kohawks compiled a 3–5 record (1–5 against MWC teams), finished in last place in the MWC, and were outscored by a total of 119 to 30.

Date	Opponent	Site	Result	Source
September 28	at Augustana (IL)*	Rock Island, IL	W 7–6	
October 5	Luther*	Cedar Rapids, IA	W 10–6	
October 12	at Carleton	Northfield, MN	L 6–13	
October 19	Cornell (IA)		L 0–13	
October 26	at Lawrence	Appleton, WI	L 0–37	
November 2	at Grinnell	Grinnell, IA	L 0–28	
November 9	Knox	Cedar Rapids, IA	W 7–6	
November 16	Ripon	Cedar Rapids, IA	L 0–10	
*Non-conference game

== All-conference team ==
The 1946 All-Midwest Conference football team included the following players who were named to the first team:

First team

- Backs: Ted Scalissi, Ripon; Carl Giordana, Lawrence; Jeptha Knox, Carleton; Kermit Steinbeck, Grinnell
- Ends: Charles Jacot, Cornell; Mel White, Grinnell
- Tackles: Don Janssen, Beloit; Richard Miller, Lawrence
- Guards: James Callan, Ripon; Joe Pelisek, Cornell
- Center: Ralph Ringgenberg, Cornell
