= 1949 Lawrence Vikings football team =

American college football season

1949 Lawrence Vikings football

MWC champion
- Conference: Midwest Conference
- Record: 7–1 (6–0 MWC)
- Head coach: Bernie Heselton (12th season)
- Home stadium: Whiting Field

1949 Midwest Conference football standings
	Conf.					Overall
Team	W		L		T	W		L		T
Lawrence $	6	–	0	–	0	7	–	1	–	0
Ripon	4	–	1	–	1	5	–	2	–	1
Knox	4	–	2	–	0	5	–	3	–	0
Carleton	4	–	2	–	0	4	–	4	–	0
Monmouth (IL)	3	–	2	–	1	4	–	3	–	1
Grinnell	3	–	3	–	0	5	–	3	–	0
Beloit	1	–	5	–	0	2	–	6	–	0
Cornell (IA)	1	–	5	–	0	1	–	7	–	0
Coe	0	–	6	–	0	1	–	6	–	1
$ – Conference champion

The 1949 Lawrence Vikings football team represented Lawrence University as a member of the Midwest Conference (MWC) during the 1949 college football season. Led by 12th-year head coach Bernie Heselton, the Vikings compiled an overall record of 7–1 with a mark of 6–0 in conference play, winning the MWC title. Lawrence played home games at Whiting Field in Appleton, Wisconsin.

== Schedule ==
Date	Time	Opponent	Site	Result	Attendance	Source
September 17	2:00 p.m.	Carroll (WI)*	Whiting Field; Appleton, WI	W 26–0	3,000	
September 24		at Grinnell	Grinnell, IA	W 19–0		
October 1	2:00 p.m.	Cornell (IA)	Whiting Field; Appleton, WI	W 14–0	3,000	
October 8	2:00 p.m.	Carleton	Whiting Field; Appleton, WI	W 20–6	4,000	
October 15		at Monmouth (IL)	Monmouth, IL	W 21–13		
October 22		at Ripon	Ripon, WI (rivalry)	W 28–7		
October 29	2:00 p.m.	Beloit^{†}	Whiting Field; Appleton, WI	W 7–0	4,000	
November 5		at Macalester*	Saint Paul, MN	L 13–26		
*Non-conference game; ^{†}Homecoming; All times are in Central time
