= Loucks Grove Church =

- U.S. National Register of Historic Places
- Location within Iowa Location within the United States
- Nearest city: Greenfield, Iowa
- Coordinates: 41°25′30″N 94°23′40″W
- Area: less than one acre
- Built: 1895
- Architectural style: Gothic
- NRHP reference No.: 95001314
- Added to NRHP: November 22, 1995

Loucks Grove Church (Wahtawah Christian Church) is a historic church in Greenfield, Iowa. It is listed in the National Register of Historic Places (NRHP).

== Description ==
The church was built in 1895 and added to the NRHP November 22, 1995. Its National Register nomination notes its significance as follows:

Loucks Grove Church stands as the lone example of an unchanged Gothic influenced rural religious building of the late 19th century in Adair County, Iowa. Such buildings represented about two-thirds of the county's churches in 1895. It is a simple, white, frame building that has withstood the test of time and has undergone no structural changes in one hundred years. With the exception of electricity and a propane space heater, it is today as it was then in 1895. The vestibule with its decorative hardware on the doors and an ogee arch window, and the sanctuary with its pointed arch windows and rounded ceiling that exhibit the Gothic influence still show the original design and construction. It is the only church in Adair County with such a distinction.

The congregation was a member of the Christian Church from 1895 to 1957, and a non-denominational church after that.

== See also ==
- National Register of Historic Places listings in Adair County, Iowa
