= Ben Douglas =

Ben Douglas may refer to:

- Ben Elbert Douglas Sr. (1894–1981), mayor of Charlotte, North Carolina
- Ben Douglas (American football) (1909–1985), American football player and coach
