= Greenfield Public Square Historic District =

Historic district in Iowa, United States

- U.S. National Register of Historic Places
- U.S. Historic district
- Location within Iowa Location within the United States
- Location: 102–362 Public Square, 201–215 S. 1st St., 107–110 E. Iowa St., Greenfield, Iowa
- Coordinates: 41°18′17.6″N 94°27′39.7″W
- Area: 7.5 acres (3.0 ha)
- Architect: Charles E. Bell; William Gordon
- Architectural style: Italianate; Classical Revival; Late 19th & Early 20th Century American Movements
- NRHP reference No.: 14000623
- Added to NRHP: September 17, 2014

Greenfield Public Square Historic District is a nationally recognized historic district located in Greenfield, Iowa, United States. It was listed on the National Register of Historic Places in 2014. At the time of its nomination the district consisted of 52 resources, including 42 contributing buildings, one contributing site, six noncontributing buildings, and three noncontributing objects. The historic district covers part of the city's central business district in the center of the original town plat. There is a significant number of one- and two-story, brick, commercial buildings, as well as a few three-story structures. The Commercial Italianate style is dominant. While the vast majority of the buildings are commercial buildings, there are four government buildings in the district: the Adair County Courthouse (1892), public library (1916), city hall (1930), and the municipal light plant (1940). Besides the courthouse, the other buildings that are individually listed on the National Register include Warren Opera House Block and Hetherington Block (1896), Adair County Democrat-Adair County Free Press Building (1903), and the Hotel Greenfield (1920).

The most unique feature of the district is the square itself, which is the contributing site. It is a Lancaster Square, of which there was only one other in an Iowa county seat, Fort Dodge. Unlike Greenfield, the courthouse in Fort Dodge was never in the square. In a Lancaster Square the streets enter the square in the middle of the surrounding blocks rather than at the corners (a Shelbyville Square), which is the most common form of public square in Iowa. The streets that surround the square are not named, so building addresses are rendered with the building number and then "Public Square." Building numbers begin on the west side of South First Street with 102 and follow clock-wise around the square ending at the east side of South First Street with 362.
