= Bill Larson (tight end) =

American football player (born 1953)

No. 85, 87, 86, 88
- Position: Tight end

Personal information
- Born: October 7, 1953 (age 73); Greenfield, Iowa, U.S.
- Listed height: 6 ft 4 in (1.93 m)
- Listed weight: 225 lb (102 kg)

Career information
- High school: Wichita West (KS)
- College: Colorado State
- NFL draft: 1975: undrafted

Career history
- San Francisco 49ers (1975); Detroit Lions (1977); Washington Redskins (1977); Philadelphia Eagles (1978); Denver Broncos (1980); Green Bay Packers (1980)

Career NFL statistics
- Games played: 43
- Receptions: 10
- Receiving Yards: 108
- Receiving TDs: 1
- Stats at Pro Football Reference

William Harry Larson (born October 7, 1953) is an American former professional football player who was a tight end in the National Football League (NFL). He played college football for the Colorado State Rams. Larson played in the NFL for the San Francisco 49ers, Detroit Lions, Washington Redskins, Philadelphia Eagles, Denver Broncos, and the Green Bay Packers.
