= Harris Lamb =

American sports coach (1904–1999)

Biographical details
- Born: 1904
- Died: March 7, 1999 (aged 94)

Playing career

Football
- 1923–1926: Coe
- Position: Fullback

Coaching career (HC unless noted)

Football
- 1931–1941: Ohio Northern
- 1945–1947: Coe

Basketball
- 1929–1937: Ohio Northern
- 1939–1942: Ohio Northern
- 1942–1952: Coe

Head coaching record
- Overall: 55–38–12 (football); 118–122 (basketball)

Harris A. Lamb (1904 – March 7, 1999) was an American football, basketball, and track coach. He served as the head football coach (1931–1941) and head basketball coach (1929–1937, 1939–1942) at Ohio Northern University in Ada, Ohio. He also coached track at Ohio Northern. Lamb to his alma mater, Coe College in Cedar Rapids, Iowa, to serve as the head football coach (1945–1947) and head basketball coach (1942–1952).

A native of Boone, Iowa, Lamb was captain of both the football and basketball teams at Coe. As coach at Coe, he was a mentor to Marv Levy, future Pro Football Hall of Fame coach. He was the brother of college football coach Clyde A. Lamb.

== Head coaching record ==
=== Football ===
| Year | Team | Overall | Conference | Standing | Bowl/playoffs |
|---|---|---|---|---|---|
Ohio Northern Polar Bears (Ohio Athletic Conference) (1931–1941)
| 1931 | Ohio Northern | 6–2 | 3–1 | T–6th | |
| 1932 | Ohio Northern | 4–2–1 | 3–1 | T–4th | |
| 1933 | Ohio Northern | 0–5–2 | 0–4–1 | T–19th | |
| 1934 | Ohio Northern | 6–0–1 | 4–0–1 | 3rd | |
| 1935 | Ohio Northern | 4–3–1 | 3–2–1 | 9th | |
| 1936 | Ohio Northern | 4–2–2 | 4–2–1 | 8th | |
| 1937 | Ohio Northern | 4–1–3 | 4–1–2 | 4th | |
| 1938 | Ohio Northern | 6–1–1 | 6–1–1 | 3rd | |
| 1939 | Ohio Northern | 5–3 | 5–2 | 6th | |
| 1940 | Ohio Northern | 5–3 | 4–3 | 8th | |
| 1941 | Ohio Northern | 6–1–1 | 5–0 | 2nd | |
| Ohio Northern: | | 50–23–12 | 41–17–7 | | |
Coe Kohawks (Midwest Conference) (1945–1947)
| 1945 | Coe | 2–2 | | | |
| 1946 | Coe | 3–5 | 1–5 | 9th | |
| 1947 | Coe | 0–8 | 0–6 | 9th | |
| Coe: | | 5–15 | 1–11 | | |
| Total: | | 55–38–12 | | | |
