= Warren Opera House Block and Hetherington Block =

- U.S. National Register of Historic Places
- U.S. Historic district – Contributing property
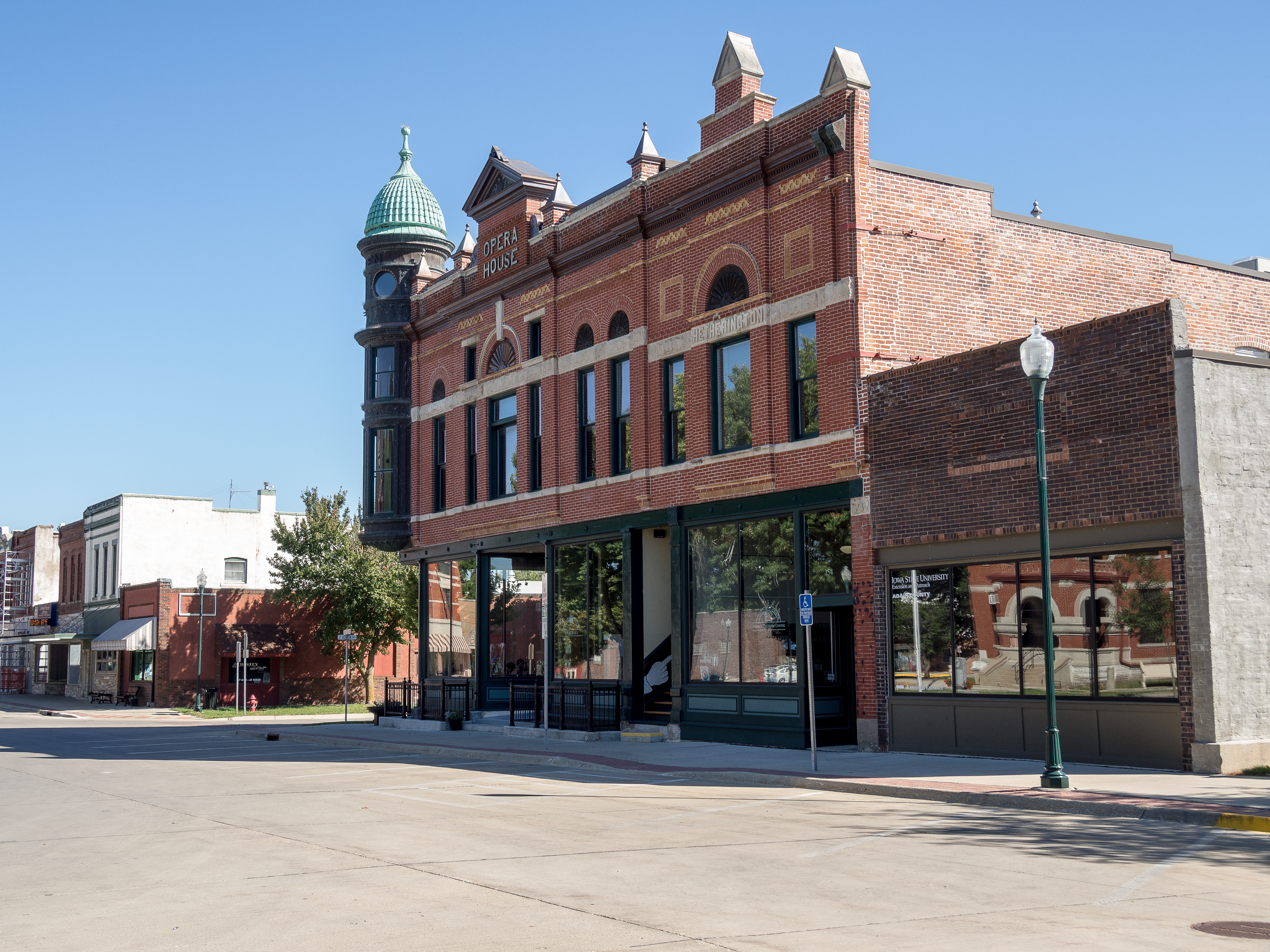

- Location within Iowa Location within the United States
- Location: 156 Public Sq. Greenfield, Iowa
- Coordinates: 41°18′17.8″N 94°27′36.7″W
- Area: less than one acre
- Built: 1896
- Architect: C.E. Bell; F. Kent
- Architectural style: Romanesque Revival
- Part of: Greenfield Public Square Historic District (ID14000623)
- NRHP reference No.: 79000880
- Added to NRHP: October 18, 1979

The Warren Opera House Block and Hetherington Block are historic buildings located in Greenfield, Iowa, United States. They are both 2½-story brick structures. The Opera House block, originally owned by E.E. Warren, is located on the corner and features a corner turret. It housed Warren's dry goods store and a theatre. The adjacent commercial block was originally owned by John J. Heatherington, and is similar in style to the Opera House block. Both buildings feature facades with a tripartite arrangement and center frontispieces that project slightly forward, a broad rock-faced beltcourse that runs above the second floor windows, a narrow metal cornice, and a brick parapet with finials. The Opera House's parapet has a triangular pediment with "Opera House" on a rectangular base, and the Hetherington Block has a similar feature in a simplified form. The buildings were listed together on the National Register of Historic Places in 1979. In 2014 they were included as a contributing property in the Greenfield Public Square Historic District.
