= Greenfield Township, Adair County, Iowa =

Township in Iowa, US

Greenfield Township, Adair County
- Township
- Coordinates: 41°17′40″N 094°27′11″W
- Country: United States
- State: Iowa
- County: Adair
- Organized: 1859

Area
  - Total: 5.71 sq mi (14.79 km^{2})
  - Land: 5.70 sq mi (14.77 km^{2})
  - Water: 0.0077 sq mi (0.02 km^{2})
- Elevation: 1,299 ft (396 m)

Population (2010)
  - Total: 2,072
  - Density: 363/sq mi (140.3/km^{2})
- Time zone: UTC-6 (CST)
  - Summer (DST): UTC-5 (CDT)
- FIPS code: 19-91755
- GNIS feature ID: 0467972

Greenfield Township is one of seventeen townships in Adair County, Iowa, USA. At the 2010 census, its population was 2,072.

== History ==
Greenfield Township was first settled in 1854. This township was organized in 1859.

== Geography ==
Greenfield Township covers an area of 5.71 square miles (14.8 km^{2}). According to the USGS, it contains one cemetery, Greenfield.

=== City ===
- Greenfield
