= Bernie Heselton =

American football coach (1903–1981)

Bernard Heselton
Biographical details
- Born: January 25, 1903; Saint Paul, Minnesota, U.S.
- Died: February 6, 1981 (aged 78); Appleton, Wisconsin, U.S.

Playing career

Football
- c. 1924: Hamline

Basketball
- c. 1924: Hamline

Coaching career (HC unless noted)

Football
- 1925–1927: Central HS (MN)
- 1928–1937: East Division HS (WI)
- 1938–1964: Lawrence

Administrative career (AD unless noted)
- 1961–1970: Lawrence

Head coaching record
- Overall: 111–79–5 (college football)

Accomplishments and honors

Championships
- Football; 6 MWC (1938, 1942, 1946, 1947, 1949, 1951)

Bernard E. Heselton (January 25, 1903 – February 6, 1981) was an American football coach. He served as the head football coach at Lawrence University in Appleton, Wisconsin, from 1938 to 1964. During his career, Heselton won six Midwest Conference (MWC) championships, including the first in his initial season as Vikings' head coach. He amassed a 111–79–5 overall record, the second-most wins in university history. Heselton, who grew up in South St. Paul, Minnesota, died in February 1981.

== Early life ==
Heselton was born January 25, 1903, in Saint Paul, Minnesota. He attended South Saint Paul High School, Hamline University and the University of Minnesota, where he graduated in 1925. Bernie starred in football and basketball while at Hamline.

Heselton married Alice Nellermoe. The couple had two daughters, Mary and Janet.

== Coaching career ==
Heselton started his coaching career at Central High School, in Duluth, Minnesota, in 1925, then moving on to East Division High School in Milwaukee, Wisconsin, in 1928, where he coached for ten years. His teams at East Division won 58 games, lost 16, and tied 6. They won six conference championships, five in succession with four undefeated seasons and a string of 32 straight wins.

While Heselton served as head coach at Lawrence University, the Vikings won the Midwest Conference (MWC) championships, in 1938, 1942, 1946, 1947, 1949 and 1951. In addition to his coaching duties at Lawrence, Heselton served as the school's athletic director from 1961 to 1970.

== Honors and legacy ==
Heselton's coaching accomplishments led to his induction to the state of Wisconsin Athletic Hall of Fame in 1981, the Wisconsin Football Coaches Association Hall of Fame in 1982, and was part the inaugural class of the Lawrence University Athletic Hall of Fame in 1996.

In 1988, to commemorate the 25 years of rivalry between Carl Doehling of Ripon College and Heselton, the two schools instituted the Doehling–Heselton Memorial Trophy. The winner of the annual game between the Red Hawks and the Vikings is awarded this traveling trophy.

== Head coaching record ==
=== College football ===
Year	Team	Overall	Conference	Standing	Bowl/playoffs
Lawrence Vikings (Midwest Conference) (1938–1964)
1938	Lawrence	6–1	5–0	1st	
1939	Lawrence	2–5	1–4	9th	
1940	Lawrence	2–5	2–5	8th	
1941	Lawrence	4–2–1	3–2–1	4th	
1942	Lawrence	6–0	5–0	1st	
1943	Lawrence	2–2			
1944	Lawrence	2–3			
1945	Lawrence	3–2			
1946	Lawrence	6–1–1	6–0	1st	
1947	Lawrence	7–1	5–1	1st	
1948	Lawrence	7–1	5–1	2nd	
1949	Lawrence	7–1	6–0	1st	
1950	Lawrence	2–5	1–5	T–6th	
1951	Lawrence	7–0	7–0	1st	
1952	Lawrence	7–1	6–1	2nd	
1953	Lawrence	6–1–1	5–1–1	3rd	
1954	Lawrence	6–2	6–2	2nd	
1955	Lawrence	1–3–1	1–3–1	NA	
1956	Lawrence	4–4	4–4	T–5th	
1957	Lawrence	1–7	1–7	T–8th	
1958	Lawrence	1–7	1–7	9th	
1959	Lawrence	4–4	4–4	T–4th	
1960	Lawrence	3–5	3–5	T–8th	
1961	Lawrence	4–4	4–4	T–6th	
1962	Lawrence	6–2	6–2	3rd	
1963	Lawrence	3–4–1	3–4–1	8th	
1964	Lawrence	2–6	2–6	T–7th	
Lawrence:		111–79–5	92–68–4		
Total:		111–79–5			
National championship Conference title Conference division title or championship game berth
