= Hotel Greenfield =

- U.S. National Register of Historic Places
- U.S. Historic district – Contributing property
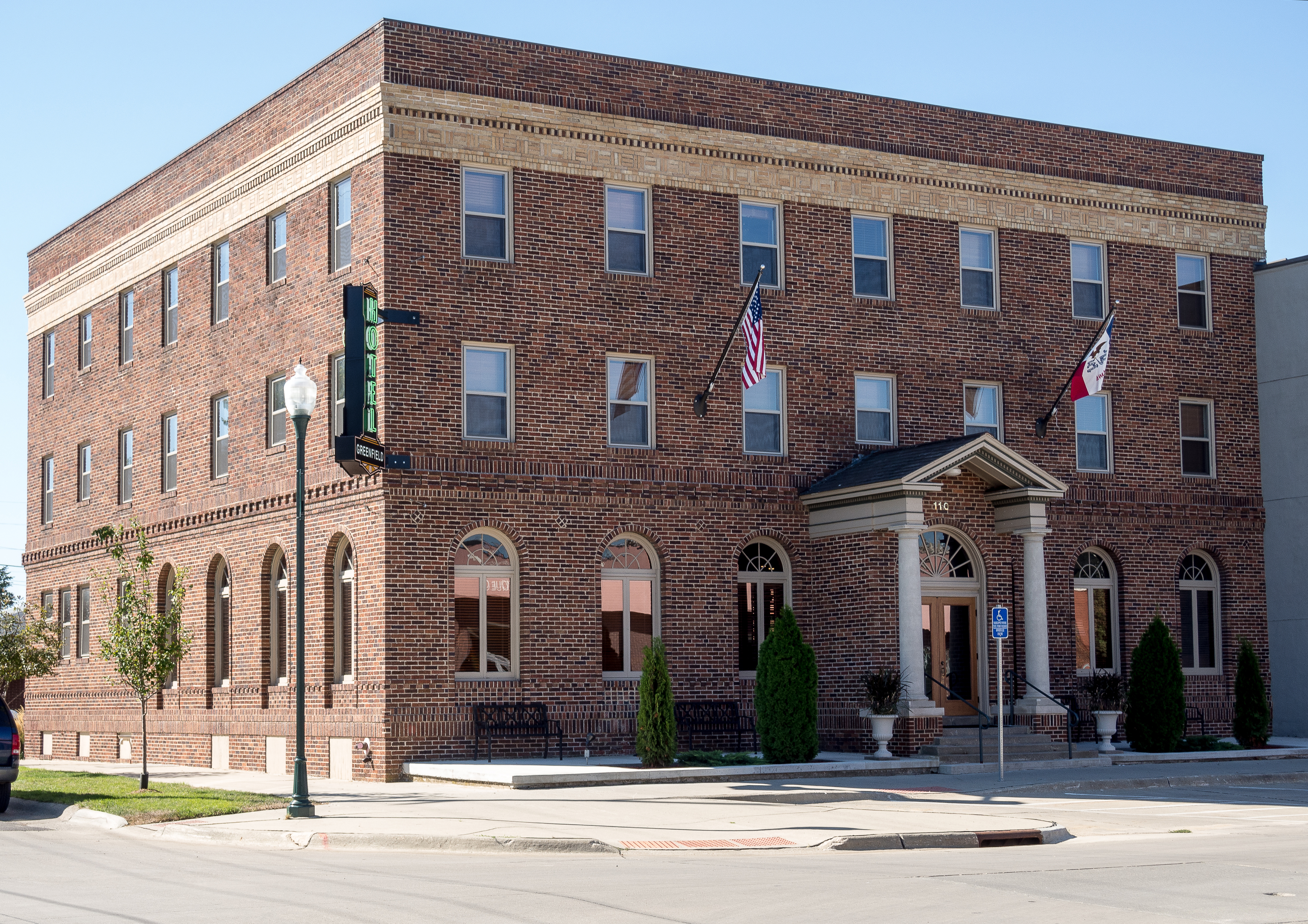

- Location within Iowa Location within the United States
- Location: 110 E. Iowa St. Greenfield, Iowa
- Coordinates: 41°18′17.6″N 94°27′35.22″W
- Area: less than one acre
- Built: 1920
- Built by: Newton Construction Co.
- Architect: William Gordon
- Architectural style: Classical Revival
- Part of: Greenfield Public Square Historic District (ID14000623)
- NRHP reference No.: 11000812
- Added to NRHP: November 18, 2011

Hotel Greenfield is a boutique hotel located in Greenfield, Iowa, United States. Designed by architect William Gordon, it was completed in 1920 by the Newton Construction Co. Local boosters had the hotel built for $65,000 as a replacement for the Commercial Hotel, which was located on the same spot. The three-story brick structure features a symmetrical facade, round arched windows on the first floor, a projecting classical entrance with columns in the Doric order, and a denticulated brick cornice. The hotel had become dated by the 1970s, and started to decline in significance. ADCO Enterprises bought it in 2010 and renovated it. They added the adjacent Adair County Democrat-Adair County Free Press Building at the same time. It houses the restaurant, lounge, two hotel suites, and the laundry and housekeeping facilities. The building was individually listed on the National Register of Historic Places in 2011. In 2014 it was included as a contributing property in the Greenfield Public Square Historic District.
