= Adair County Free Press Building =

Historic building in Iowa, United States

- Adair County Democrat–Adair County Free Press Building
- U.S. National Register of Historic Places
- U.S. Historic district – Contributing property
- Location within Iowa Location within the United States
- Location: 108 E. Iowa St. Greenfield, Iowa
- Coordinates: 41°18′17″N 94°27′36″W
- Area: less than one acre
- Built: 1903
- Architect: John Karl
- Architectural style: Late 19th and Early 20th Century American Movements
- Part of: Greenfield Public Square Historic District (ID14000623)
- NRHP reference No.: 10001203
- Added to NRHP: February 7, 2011

Adair County Free Press Building is a historic building located in Greenfield, Iowa, United States. Designed by architect John Karl, it was completed in 1903. The two-story brick structure features an asymmetrical facade with four round arched openings, and a corbelled brick cornice. It was built by Edwin J. Sidey and his father John S. Sidey, who founded the Adair County Democrat in 1889, and was later renamed the Adair County Free Press. Journalist Hugh Sidey was another of John S. Sidey's sons. The building is now a part of the adjacent Hotel Greenfield. It houses the restaurant, lounge, two hotel suites, and the laundry and housekeeping facilities. The building was individually listed on the National Register of Historic Places in 2011 as the Adair County Democrat–Adair County Free Press Building. In 2014 it was included as a contributing property in the Greenfield Public Square Historic District.
