= Carl Doehling =

American football coach (1896–1985)

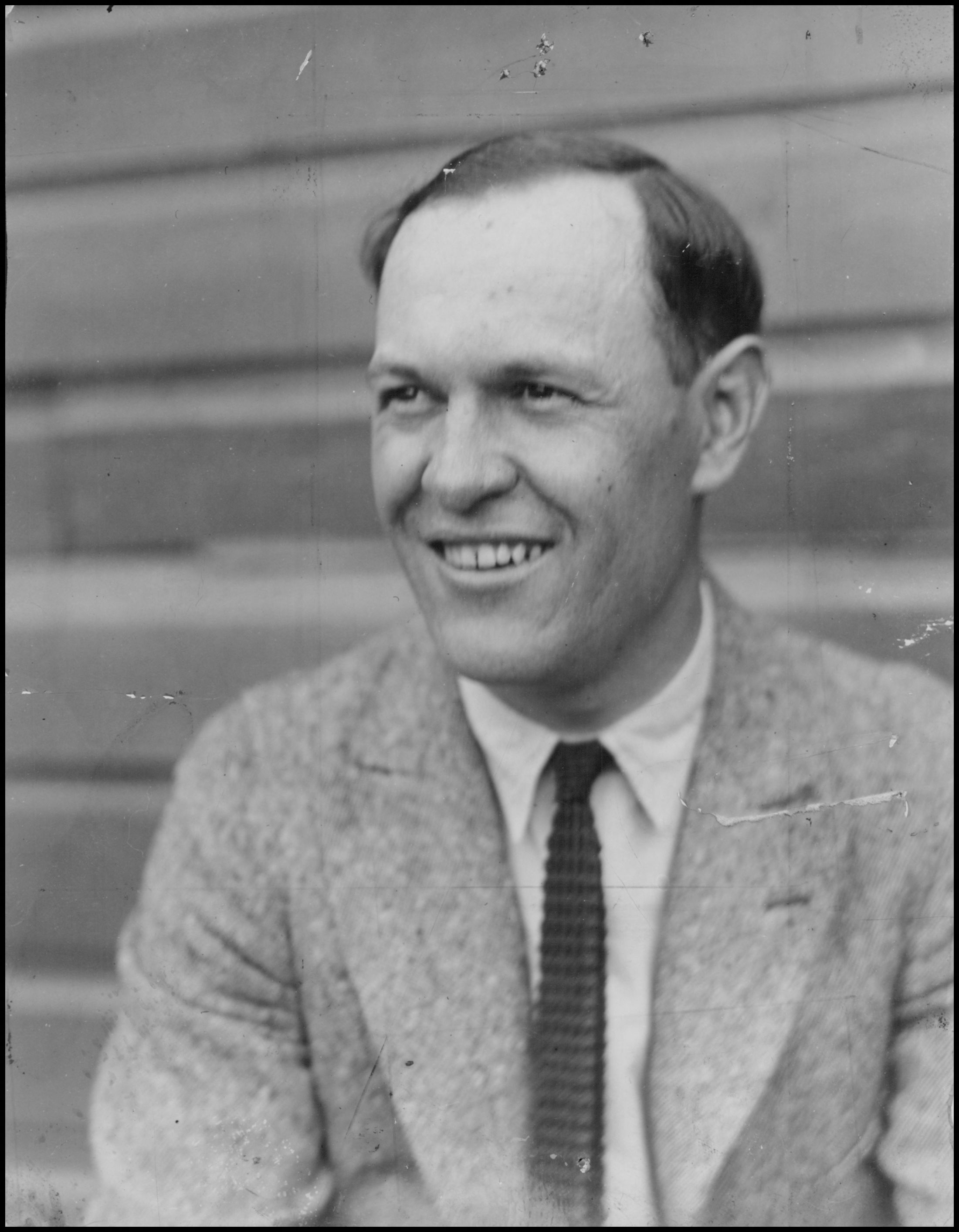

Biographical details
- Born: April 17, 1896; Denver, Colorado, U.S.
- Died: May 21, 1985 (aged 89); Ripon, Wisconsin, U.S.

Playing career

Football
- 1916: Colorado Agricultural

Coaching career (HC unless noted)

Football
- 1924–1955: Ripon

Basketball
- 1924–1926: Ripon

Baseball
- 1956: Ripon

Head coaching record
- Overall: 95–99–24 (football); 11–15 (basketball); 3–5 (baseball)

Accomplishments and honors

Championships
- Football; 8 MWC (1929, 1931–1932, 1935, 1939, 1941, 1948, 1950)

Carl Herman Doehling (April 17, 1896 – May 21, 1985) was an American football coach. He was the head football coach at the Ripon College in Ripon, Wisconsin from 1924 to 1955. During his 32-year reign, Doehling coached teams to 15 conference championships, nine in the Midwest Conference and six from the old Wisconsin state conference known as the Big Four Conference.

== Career ==
Doehling began his coaching career in 1922 when he was offered a position at Central High School in Minneapolis, Minnesota. There he coached his teams to football and track state championships in successive years of 1923 and 1924. His success in the high school ranks, made him an attractive candidate to Ripon officials and in 1924 he was offered him the position as athletic director and head football coach. Ripon teams had struggled for years and Doehling was seen was given the charge of building the program from the ground up.

Doehling knew the entire program needed an overhaul. He looked at the University of Wisconsin–Madison athletic department as his model. Not only did Wisconsin have strong intercollegiate athletics teams, but they also had a huge intramural sports program. The coach saw this as something he felt should be in Ripon’s agenda and implemented it. By 1928, Ripon College had one of the strongest intramural departments in the state.

Ripon's intramural program and intercollegiate sports flourished during his time. Ripon gained clout on both the local, regional and national levels during his term. One of Doehling's grandest victories came when his 1928 squad, a heavy underdog, defeated the powerhouse University of Chicago, 12–0. This was Ripon’s first ever victory against a Big Ten Conference opponent, and reportedly spread the Redmen name across the country. Thirty-thousand spectators came out to witness Ripon’s great upset, probably the largest crowd a Ripon team has ever played.

Ripon teams did not always enjoy unbridled success during the Doehling era though. His final career record at Ripon was 95–99–24.

== Memorial ==
In 1988, to commemorate the 25 years of rivalry between Doehling and Bernie Heselton, coach of Lawrence University from 1938 to 1964, the two schools instituted the Doehling–Heselton Memorial Trophy. The winner of the annual game between the Red Hawks and the Vikings is awarded this traveling trophy.

== Head coaching record ==
=== Football ===
Year	Team	Overall	Conference	Standing	Bowl/playoffs
Ripon Crimson/Redmen (Midwest Conference) (1924–1955)
1924	Ripon	2–3–2	1–1–1	T–4th	
1925	Ripon	2–5	0–3	T–7th	
1926	Ripon	2–3–2	1–2–1	T–7th	
1927	Ripon	3–3–1	2–2	T–4th	
1928	Ripon	4–3	2–1	T–3rd	
1929	Ripon	3–3–1	2–0–1	T–1st	
1930	Ripon	2–5	2–1	T–3rd	
1931	Ripon	4–3	3–0	T–1st	
1932	Ripon	3–2–2	1–0–1	T–1st	
1933	Ripon	3–2–1	1–1	T–4th	
1934	Ripon	0–5–2	0–2–1	T–7th	
1935	Ripon	4–2–1	2–0–1	1st	
1936	Ripon	3–3–1	2–2	T–4th	
1937	Ripon	2–4–1	1–2–1	5th	
1938	Ripon	2–5	2–3	T–5th	
1939	Ripon	3–1–2	3–1–1	T–1st	
1940	Ripon	3–4–1	2–3–1	6th	
1941	Ripon	6–2–1	5–0–1	1st	
1942	Ripon	3–5	3–3	T–4th	
1943	No team—World War II				
1944	No team—World War II				
1945	Ripon	4–1	NA	NA	
1946	Ripon	4–3–1	3–1–1	2nd	
1947	Ripon	2–5–1	2–3	8th	
1948	Ripon	6–2	6–0	1st	
1949	Ripon	5–2–1	4–1–1	2nd	
1950	Ripon	6–2	5–1	T–1st	
1951	Ripon	6–2	6–1	2nd	
1952	Ripon	3–4	2–4	7th	
1953	Ripon	1–6	1–5	8th	
1954	Ripon	2–4–2	2–4–2	T–5th	
1955	Ripon	2–5–1	2–5	6th	
Ripon:		95–99–24	68–51–14		
Total:		95–99–24			
National championship Conference title Conference division title or championship game berth
