= Ben Douglas (American football) =

American football player and sports coach (1909–1985)

Biographical details
- Born: March 12, 1909; Denver, Colorado, U.S.
- Died: December 4, 1985 (aged 76); Brandon, Florida, U.S.

Playing career

Football
- 1928–1930: Grinnell
- 1933: Brooklyn Dodgers
- Position: Halfback

Coaching career (HC unless noted)

Football
- 1931: Greenfield HS (IA)
- 1934–1939: Maplewood HS (MO)
- 1940–1941: Grinnell
- 1946: Grinnell
- 1947: Colorado College
- 1949: Missouri Mines (assistant)
- 1950–1951: Iowa (assistant)

Basketball
- 1931–1932: Cornell (IA)
- 1940–1942: Grinnell
- 1946–1947: Grinnell
- 1949–1950: Missouri Mines
- 1950–1952: Iowa (assistant)

Administrative career (AD unless noted)
- 1947–1948: Colorado College

Head coaching record
- Overall: 18–17 (college football)

Frank Benjamin Douglas (March 12, 1909 – December 4, 1985) was an American football player and coach of football and basketball.

== Playing ==
Douglas attended at Grinnell College in Grinnell, Iowa, where he was an All-Missouri Valley Conference back in football and guard in basketball and was the conference champion in indoor and outdoor high jump. He finished fourth in the decathlon at the Kansas Relays. He played Brooklyn Dodgers of the National Football League (NFL) in 1933. He was also a member of the Wichita Henrys amateur basketball team.

== Coaching ==
Douglas began his coaching career at Greenfield High School in Greenfield, Iowa. He was the head basketball coach at Cornell College in Mount Vernon, Iowa during the 1932–33 season. From 1934 to 1940, he coached football and basketball at Maplewood High School in Maplewood, Missouri. He developed future Missouri football star Paul Christman. He then returned to Grinnell as head football and basketball coach. He entered the United States Navy in 1942 and was an officer in its physical education program during World War II. He returned to Grinnell in 1946, but left the following year to become the head football coach and athletic director at Colorado College in Colorado Springs, Colorado in 1947. He resigned in 1948 to enter private business. He returned to coaching the following year as the head basketball and assistant football coach at Missouri Mines. In 1950, he became an assistant football and basketball coach at the University of Iowa. He resigned at the end of the 1951-52 basketball season.

== Later life ==
After leaving coaching, Douglas managed the purchasing department of Collins Radio. He then worked for the Amana Refrigeration, where he rose to the position of president of international operations. He died in 1985 at his home in Florida.

== Head coaching record ==
=== College football ===
Year	Team	Overall	Conference	Standing
Grinnell Pioneers (Midwest Conference) (1940–1941)
1940	Grinnell	5–4	4–2	3rd
1941	Grinnell	6–3	4–2	3rd
Grinnell Pioneers (Midwest Conference) (1946)
1946	Grinnell	3–5	2–4	T–6th
Grinnell:		14–12	10–8	
Colorado College Tigers (Rocky Mountain Conference) (1947)
1947	Colorado College	4–5	2–1	2nd
Colorado College:		4–5	2–1	
Total:		18–17		
