= Waldo Don Carlos =

American football player (1909–1997)

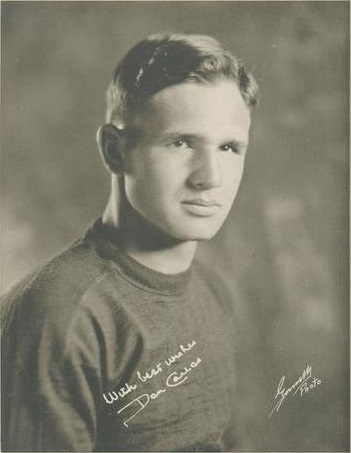

No. 24
- Position: Center

Personal information
- Born: October 16, 1909; Greenfield, Iowa, U.S.
- Died: June 18, 1997 (aged 87)
- Listed height: 6 ft 2 in (1.88 m)
- Listed weight: 190 lb (86 kg)

Career information
- High school: Theodore Roosevelt (Des Moines, Iowa)
- College: Drake

Career history
- Green Bay Packers (1931)

Awards and highlights
- NFL champion (1931)

Career statistics
- Games played: 12
- Games started: 6
- Stats at Pro Football Reference

Waldo Emerson Don Carlos (October 16, 1909 – June 18, 1997) was an American football center for the Green Bay Packers of the National Football League (NFL). He played college football for Drake. He won an NFL championship with the Packers in 1931.

== Biography ==
Carlos was born on October 16, 1909, in Greenfield, Iowa.

== Career ==
Carlos played with the Green Bay Packers during the 1931 NFL season. As such, he was a member of the 1931 NFL Champion Packers. He had previously played at the collegiate level at Drake University.

Carlos was the fourth Latin American in the history of the NFL to play on a team.
