= Ron Ernst =

American football player and coach (born 1957)

Biographical details
- Born: October 5, 1957 (age 69); Hastings, Nebraska, U.S.

Coaching career (HC unless noted)
- 1980–1981: Osceola HS (NE)
- 1982–1985: Fort Calhoun HS (NE)
- 1986–1988: Greeley Central HS (CO)
- 1989–1990: Northern Colorado (DL)
- 1991–2022: Ripon
- 2023: Ingolstadt Dukes (DC)

Head coaching record
- Overall: 193–114 (college)

Accomplishments and honors

Championships
- 3 MWC (1996, 2001, 2022); 3 MWC North Division (1995–1997)

Awards
- 2× MWC Coach of the Year (1996, 2022); 4× Wisconsin Football Coaches Association Wisconsin Private College Coach of the Year (2001, 2008, 2010, 2022)

Ron Ernst (born October 5, 1957) is an American football coach. He served as the head football coach at Ripon College in Ripon, Wisconsin from 1991 to 2022, compiling a record of 193–114. Ernst won his 100th game during the 2006 season and won more games than any other coach in program history. Ernst also served as Ripon's head men's golf coach, associate professor in the Department of Exercise Science and assistant athletic director.

== Early life and education ==
A native of Hastings, Nebraska, Ernst is a 1980 graduate of Nebraska Wesleyan University where he received his bachelor's degree in social science and physical education. He earned his master's degree in physical education and athletic administration at the University of Northern Colorado in 1990. While attending Nebraska Wesleyan, Ernst was a four-year letterman in football, a three-year letterman in track and earned one letter in baseball.

== Coaching career ==
Ernst began his coaching career at the high school level. He served as the head football coach at three different high schools in Nebraska and Colorado, winning a conference championship at each school.

From 1980 to 1981 Ernst was the head football coach at Osceola High School in Osceola, Nebraska. By his second season, the Bulldogs had won a conference championship and were rated third in the region.

From 1982 to 1985 Ernst was the head football coach at Fort Calhoun High School in Fort Calhoun, Nebraska. Ernst took over a program that had never had a winning season in the school's history. By his third season, the Pioneers had won a conference championship, qualified for the state playoffs and were ranked eighth in the state classification C-2.

From 1986 to 1988, Ernst was the head football coach at Greeley Central High School in Greeley, Colorado. Ernst took over a program that had not had a winning season in more than 20 years. By his second year, the Wildcats were Northern Conference champions, finishing the season in the state semifinal playoffs. In 1987, Ernst was named Colorado AAA Coach of the Year by The Denver Post.

Ernst served as the defensive line coach at the University of Northern Colorado under Joe Glenn from 1989 to 1990. The Bears qualified for the NCAA Division II Football Championship playoffs in 1990.

== Ripon ==
Ernst hit a milestone in 2006, winning his 100th career game. In 2006, Ernst was inducted into the Ripon College Hall of Fame, and in March 2009 he was inducted into the Wisconsin Football Coaches Association Hall of Fame. In 2015, Ernst became the all-time winningest coach in both Midwest Conference and Ripon College history.

Ernst has led the Red Hawks to 26 winning seasons, three division titles (1995, 1996 and 1997) in the now-defunct North Division and three MWC titles (1996, 2001, and 2022).

He was first named the Midwest Conference Coach of the Year in 1996 when he led the team to a record nine-win season. He also has been named the NCAA Division III Region 5 Coach of the Year in 1995, and the Wisconsin Private College Coach of the Year from the Wisconsin Football Coaches Association in 2001, 2008, and 2010. Most recently, he was named as both the 2022 Midwest Conference Coach of the Year and the 2022 Wisconsin Private College Coach of the Year after leading the Red Hawks to a 9-1 record.

Ernst retired after the 2022 season.

== Personal life ==
Ernst resides in Ripon, Wisconsin with his wife, Janet. They have three sons: Tim, Bryan, and John.

== Head coaching record ==
=== College ===
Year	Team	Overall	Conference	Standing	Bowl/playoffs
Ripon Redmen / Red Hawks (Midwest Conference) (1991–2022)
1991	Ripon	5–4	2–2	3rd (North)	
1992	Ripon	5–4	2–3	4th (North)	
1993	Ripon	5–4	2–3	T–4th (North)	
1994	Ripon	4–5	2–3	4th (North)	
1995	Ripon	8–2	4–1	1st (North)	
1996	Ripon	9–1	5–0	1st (North)	
1997	Ripon	6–3	4–1	T–1st (North)	
1998	Ripon	7–3	7–2	T–2nd	
1999	Ripon	6–4	6–3	T–3rd	
2000	Ripon	9–1	8–1	2nd	
2001	Ripon	8–2	7–1	T–1st	
2002	Ripon	7–3	7–2	3rd	
2003	Ripon	6–4	5–4	4th	
2004	Ripon	5–5	4–5	6th	
2005	Ripon	6–4	5–4	T–4th	
2006	Ripon	7–3	7–2	T–2nd	
2007	Ripon	7–3	7–2	T–2nd	
2008	Ripon	8–2	8–1	2nd	
2009	Ripon	7–3	7–2	3rd	
2010	Ripon	7–3	6–3	T–2nd	
2011	Ripon	6–4	5–4	5th	
2012	Ripon	5–5	5–4	T–5th	
2013	Ripon	7–3	6–3	5th	
2014	Ripon	3–7	2–3	4th (North)	
2015	Ripon	7–3	3–2	3rd (North)	
2016	Ripon	2–8	2–6	T–7th	
2017	Ripon	5–5	3–2	T–2nd (North)	
2018	Ripon	7–3	3–2	3rd (North)	
2019	Ripon	4–6	3–2	3rd (North)	
2020–21	Ripon	0–3	0–0	N/A	
2021	Ripon	6–3	5–3	4th	
2022	Ripon	9–1	8–1	T–1st	
Ripon:		193–114	150–77		
Total:		193–114			
National championship Conference title Conference division title or championship game berth
