= Hugh Sidey =

American journalist

Hugh Swanson Sidey
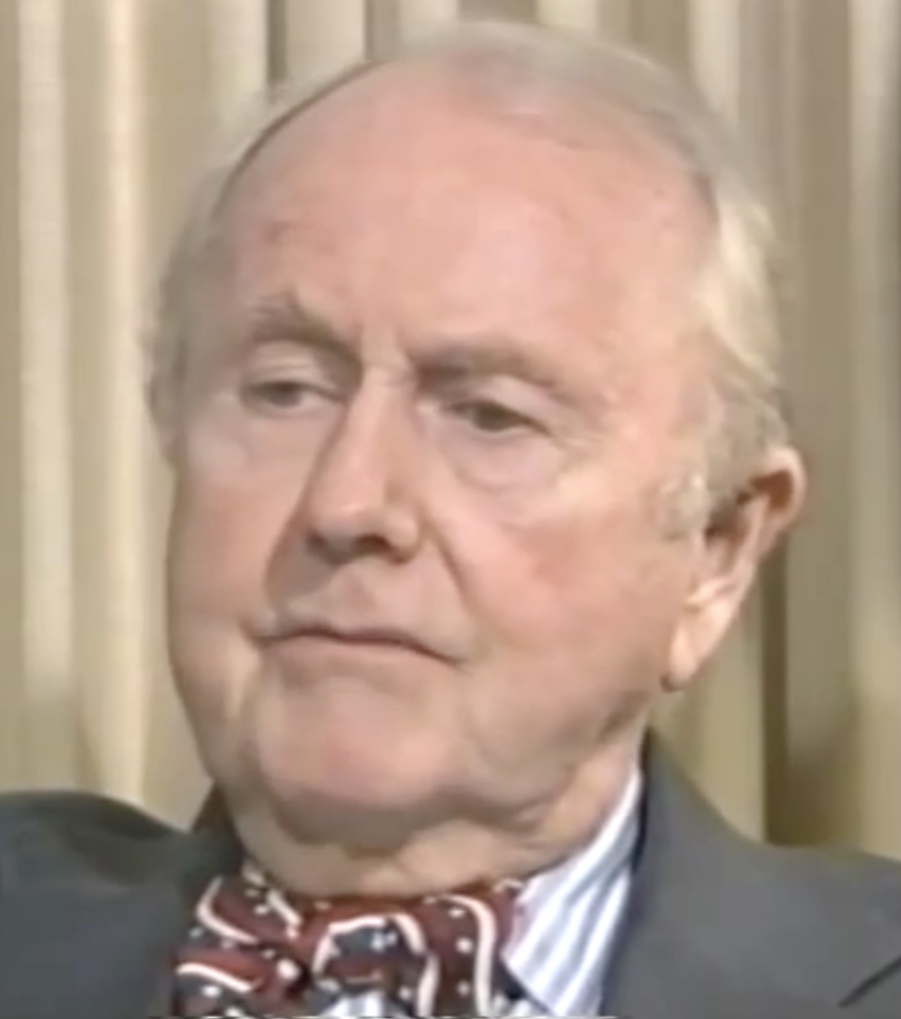
- Sidey in 2002
- Born: September 3, 1927; Greenfield, Iowa, U.S.
- Died: November 21, 2005 (aged 78); Paris, France
- Occupation: Journalist

Hugh Swanson Sidey (September 3, 1927 – November 21, 2005) was an Iowa State University educated American journalist who worked for Life magazine starting in 1955, then moved on to Time magazine in 1957.

He covered nine Presidents, from Eisenhower to Clinton, and was author of the book Hugh Sidey's Portraits of the Presidents.

== Biography ==
Born in Greenfield, Iowa, in 1927, he attended Iowa State College and graduated with a B.S. in journalism. After graduation he worked for local newspapers in Council Bluffs and Omaha. While in Omaha, he taught undergraduate journalism classes at Creighton University where he was exposed to frequent, lengthy political debates between conservatives and liberals alike. He learned the lasting lesson that it was paramount to have all your facts straight and that how you said something was sometimes more important than what you said. An old Jesuit at Creighton recommended him to some former students in New York and Sidey landed a job with Life magazine where he made an immediate impact.

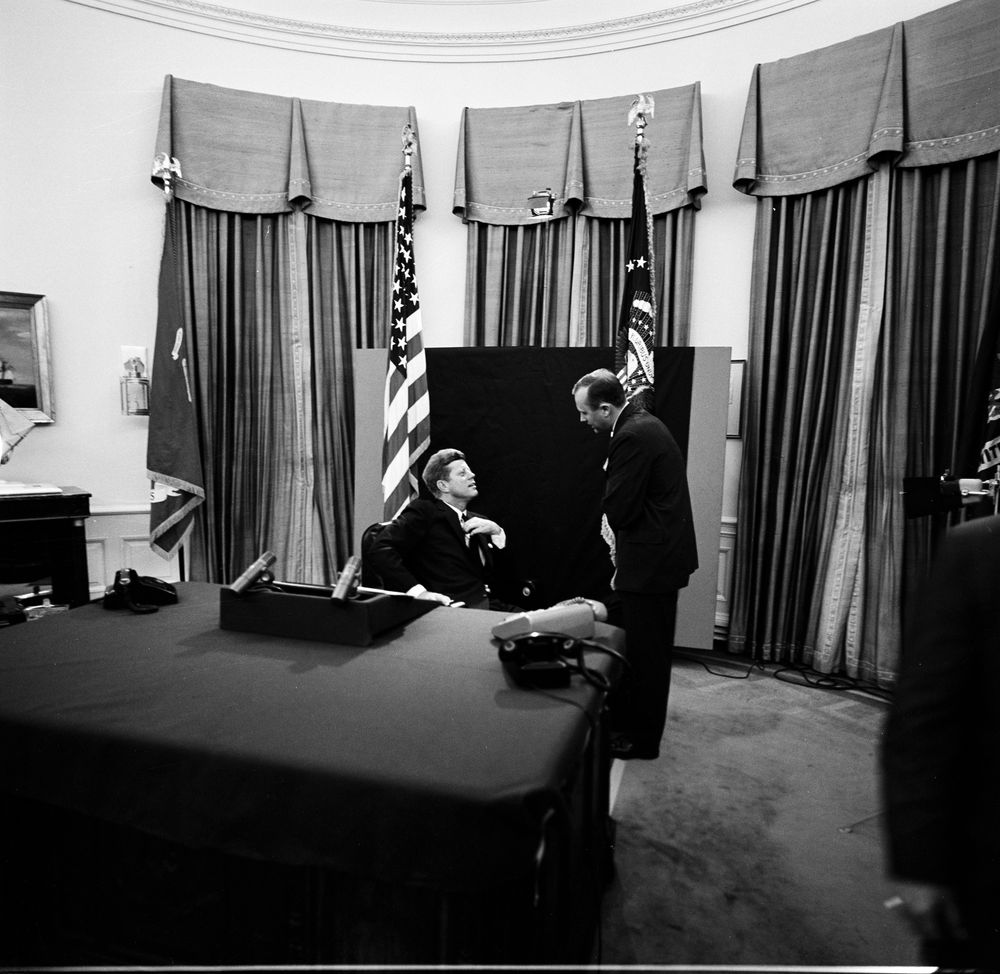
Sidey (right) speaking to John F. Kennedy (left) in the Oval Office in 1963

Sidey correctly guessed that something was amiss when in 1966 he saw the fastidiously dressed President Lyndon B. Johnson wearing brown shoes with a gray suit. Johnson then flew to Vietnam for a surprise public relations visit later that day.

Sidey retired from Time in 1996, although continued to write for the magazine until his death. He hosted the PBS series The American Presidents. Sidey served as president of the board of directors of the White House Historical Association from 1998 to 2001, during the White House's bicentenary celebration.

Sidey died of an apparent heart attack while vacationing in Paris at the age of 78. Former president George H. W. Bush delivered a eulogy at Sidey's funeral. Sidey left behind three daughters, a son and his wife, Anne.

In 2006, The Hugh S. Sidey Scholarship in Print Journalism was established at the Greenlee School of Journalism and Communications at Iowa State University by The White House Historical Association.
