= Adair County Courthouse (Iowa) =

- U.S. National Register of Historic Places
- U.S. Historic district – Contributing property
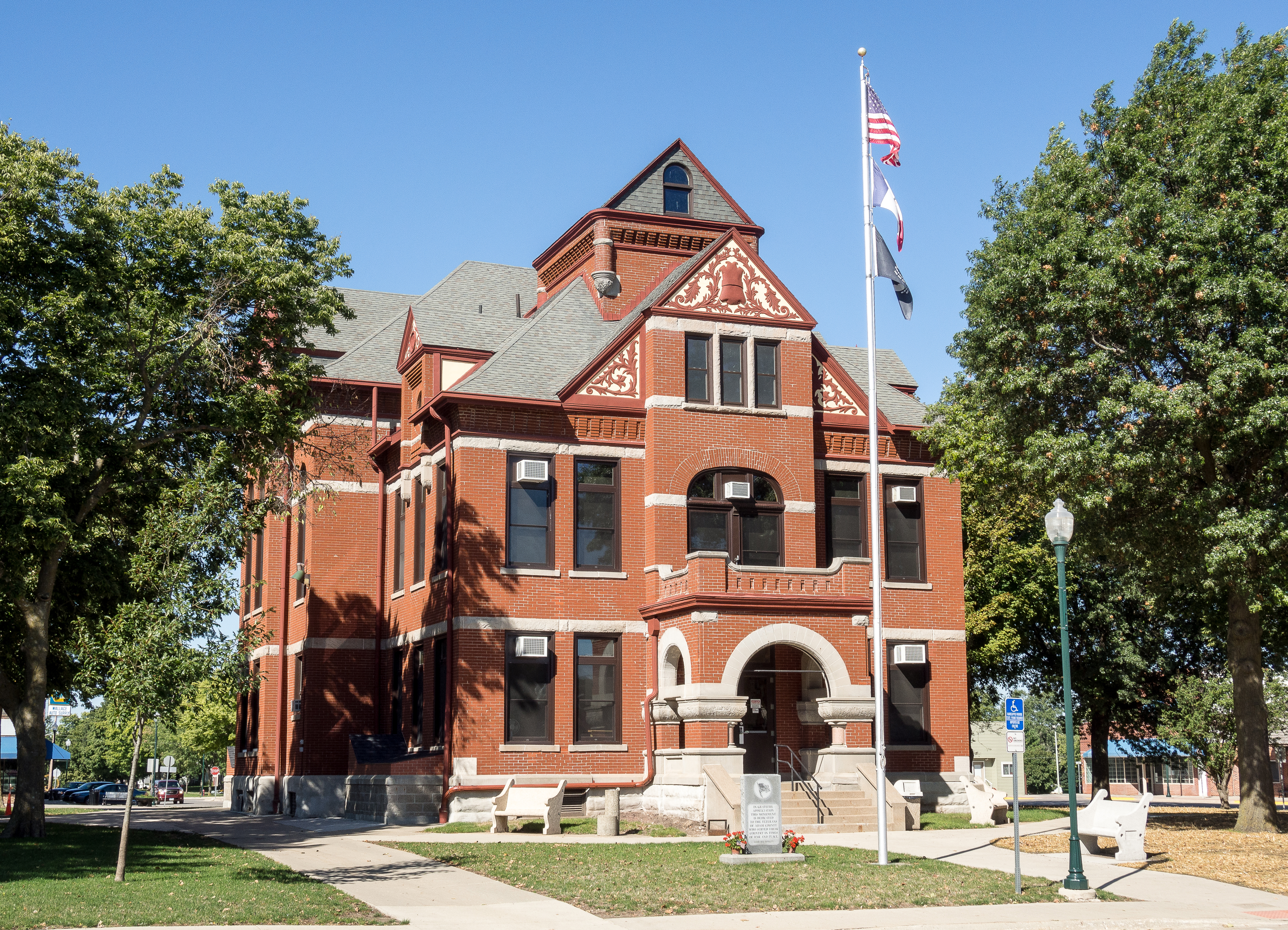

- Location within Iowa Location within the United States
- Interactive map showing the location of Adair County Courthouse
- Location: Iowa Ave. and 1st St. Greenfield, Iowa
- Coordinates: 41°18′17″N 94°27′35″W
- Area: less than one acre
- Built: 1891
- Architect: S.E. Maxon
- Architectural style: Romanesque Revival
- Part of: Greenfield Public Square Historic District (ID14000623)
- MPS: County Courthouses in Iowa TR
- NRHP reference No.: 81000224
- Added to NRHP: July 2, 1981

The Adair County Courthouse, located in Greenfield, Iowa, United States, was built from 1891 to 1892. It was individually listed on the National Register of Historic Places in 1981 as a part of the County Courthouses in Iowa Thematic Resource. In 2014 it was included as a contributing property in the Greenfield Public Square Historic District. The courthouse is the third structure to house county courts and administration offices.

== History ==
The county's first courthouse was located in Fontanelle from 1856 to 1874. It was a two-story frame building constructed from locally harvested wood. After the county seat moved to Greenfield the building was used as a school, church, meeting hall and town hall until it was destroyed in a fire in 1910. A two-story courthouse was built in Greenfield for $8,000. It was destroyed by fire in 1889 and courthouse functions moved to a nearby opera house until a new structure was completed. The cornerstone for the present courthouse was laid on July 4, 1891. It was constructed of brick in the Romanesque Revival style at a cost of $26,768.

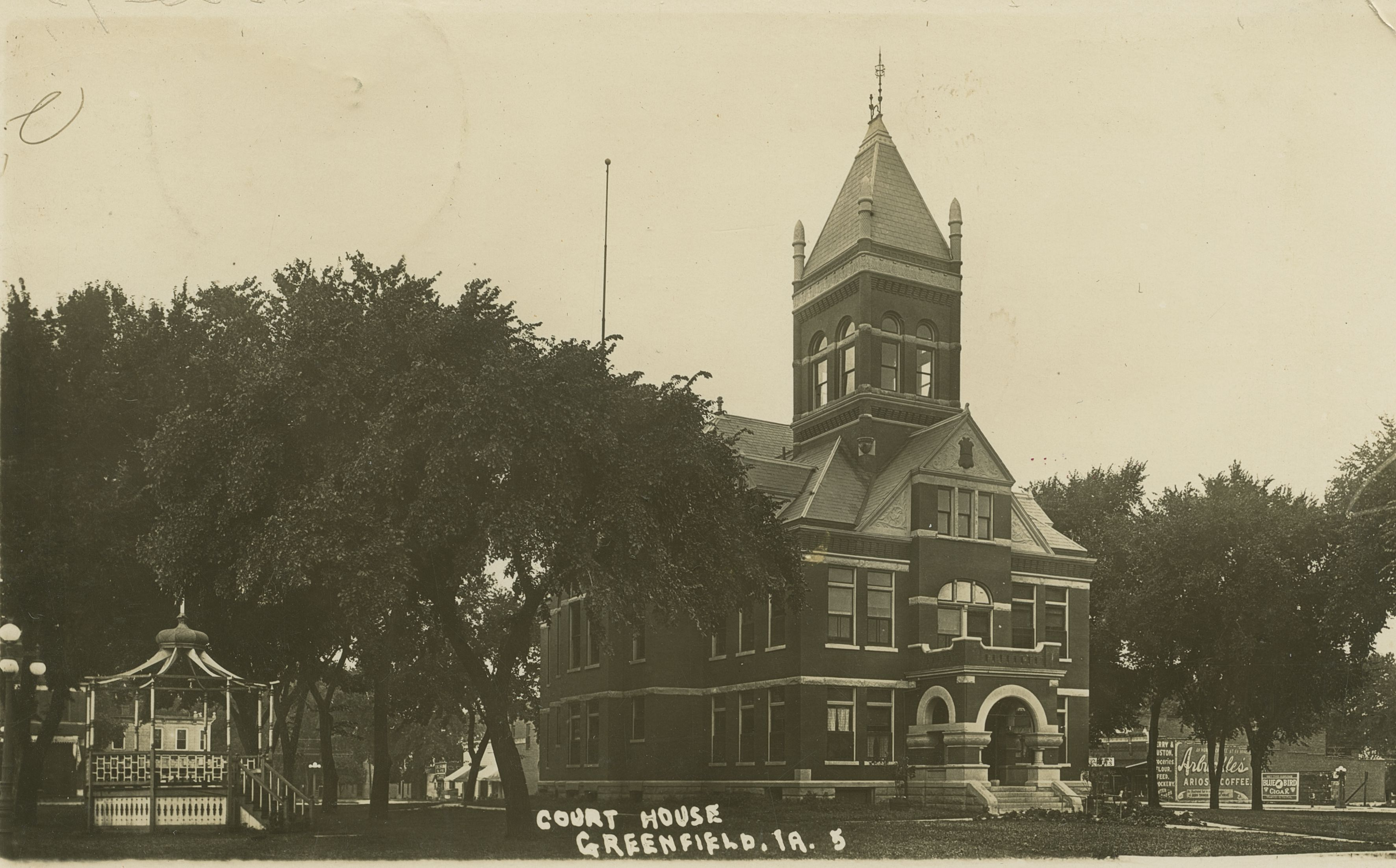
The courthouse with the tower still in place.

On May 21, 2024, the city of Greenfield was struck by a violent EF4 tornado that tore the southern part of the town. The tornado narrowly missed striking the Adair County courthouse by as little as 5-6 blocks.

== Architecture ==
The 2½-story brick structure utilizes limestone for the high foundation, the water table, the belt courses at the top of the windows, the capitals of the brick pilasters, and for the arched surround that frames the main entrance. It is capped with a hip roof with gabled dormers. The building originally had a central tower that was removed at some point in the mid-twentieth century. Its significance is derived from its association with county government, and the political power and prestige of Greenfield as the county seat.
