= Doehling–Heselton Memorial Trophy =

- Teams: Lawrence Vikings; Ripon Red Hawks
- First meeting: 1893; Ripon 24, Lawrence 6
- Latest meeting: 2026; Ripon 62, Lawrence 12
- Next meeting: 2027
- Trophy: Doehling–Heselton Memorial Trophy

Statistics
- Total meetings: 124
- All-time series: Ripon leads, 71–46–7
- Trophy series: Ripon leads, 31–4
- Largest victory: Ripon, 82–0 (2022)
- Longest win streak: Ripon, 25 (2000–present)
- Current win streak: Ripon, 25 (2000–present)
- Locations in Wisconsin

The Doehling–Heselton Memorial Trophy is awarded annually to the winner of the Division III college football game between Ripon College Red Hawks and the Lawrence University Vikings. The Ripon-Lawrence rivalry is the oldest college football rivalry in the state of Wisconsin dating back to 1893. The game is the 14th oldest college football rivalry in the nation. Ripon holds a 70–46–7 advantage in the series.

Locations of Lawrence and Ripon

== History ==
The series began in 1893 with a 24–6 Ripon victory, and the schools have taken turns dominating the series.

While Lawrence generally owned the early part of the series, outside of a match in 1901 where both teams claimed victory, Ripon dominated the 1920s and 1930s. Lawrence was the best team in the 1940s, while the teams split the series during the 1950s. Ripon again had the upper hand in the 1960s, but Lawrence was the top team from the mid-1970s through the late 1980s. Ripon is currently on the longest winning streak in the series with twenty–four consecutive victories.

At times the rivalry between the schools has been brutal. The Lawrentian worried in 1896 that the rivalry was so intense that football might be banned as a sport. As the columnist noted, "Such playing will kill football. . . . If Ripon or football must die, we are sorry, but it ought to be Ripon." An article in the Appleton Post-Crescent noted that the Vikings would have scored more in their 23 to 6 victory in 1901, but that on two occasions, "Lawrence men who had got clear away for a run down a clear field were tackled by spectators."

The teams had played for a traveling trophy during the 1950s known as "The Old Paint Bucket". The Doehling–Heselton Memorial Trophy was instituted in 1988 to commemorate 25 years of rivalry between Carl Doehling, Ripon coach from 1924 to 1955 and Bernie Heselton, Lawrence coach from 1938 to 1964.

== Traditions ==
Upon a victory by the Vikings over the Red Hawks, the bell in Main Hall on the Lawrence campus is rung. The bell is only rung three times annually; the other two times being Matriculation and Commencement.

== Game results ==
| Lawrence victories | Ripon victories | Tie games |

| No. | Date | Location | Winner | Score |
|---|---|---|---|---|
| 1 | 1893 | Ripon, WI | Ripon | 24–6 |
| 2 | 1894 | Ripon, WI | Ripon | 80–0 |
| 3 | 1895 | Appleton, WI | Ripon | 16–6 |
| 4 | 1896 | Ripon, WI | Ripon | 58–4 |
| 5 | 1899 | Appleton, WI | Tie | 6–6 |
| 6 | 1901 | Ripon, WI | Lawrence | 23–6 |
| 7 | 1902 | Appleton, WI | Lawrence | 11–6 |
| 8 | 1903 | Appleton, WI | Lawrence | 24–0 |
| 9 | 1905 | Appleton, WI | Lawrence | 56–0 |
| 10 | 1906 | Ripon, WI | Ripon | 18–6 |
| 11 | 1907 | Appleton, WI | Lawrence | 12–0 |
| 12 | 1910 | Ripon, WI | Ripon | 10–8 |
| 13 | 1911 | Appleton, WI | Lawrence | 13–0 |
| 14 | 1912 | Ripon, WI | Lawrence | 7–0 |
| 15 | 1913 | Appleton, WI | Lawrence | 14–0 |
| 16 | 1914 | Ripon, WI | Lawrence | 12–2 |
| 17 | 1915 | Appleton, WI | Ripon | 7–0 |
| 18 | 1916 | Ripon, WI | Ripon | 13–0 |
| 19 | 1918 | Appleton, WI | Lawrence | 24–0 |
| 20 | 1919 | Appleton, WI | Ripon | 20–7 |
| 21 | 1920 | Ripon, WI | Lawrence | 22–3 |
| 22 | 1921 | Appleton, WI | Lawrence | 7–3 |
| 23 | 1922 | Ripon, WI | Lawrence | 20–0 |
| 24 | 1923 | Appleton, WI | Lawrence | 17–0 |
| 25 | 1924 | Ripon, WI | Tie | 7–7 |
| 26 | 1925 | Appleton, WI | Lawrence | 3–0 |
| 27 | 1926 | Ripon, WI | Tie | 0–0 |
| 28 | 1927 | Appleton, WI | Ripon | 7–6 |
| 29 | 1928 | Ripon, WI | Ripon | 24–0 |
| 30 | 1929 | Appleton, WI | Tie | 7–7 |
| 31 | 1930 | Ripon, WI | Ripon | 6–0 |
| 32 | 1931 | Appleton, WI | Ripon | 24–0 |
| 33 | 1932 | Ripon, WI | Ripon | 12–7 |
| 34 | 1933 | Appleton, WI | Ripon | 16–0 |
| 35 | 1934 | Ripon, WI | Lawrence | 15–9 |
| 36 | 1935 | Appleton, WI | Ripon | 18–14 |
| 37 | 1936 | Ripon, WI | Ripon | 26–0 |
| 38 | 1937 | Appleton, WI | Tie | 7–7 |
| 39 | 1938 | Ripon, WI | Lawrence | 14–13 |
| 40 | 1939 | Appleton, WI | Ripon | 13–0 |
| 41 | 1940 | Ripon, WI | Ripon | 7–0 |
| 42 | 1941 | Appleton, WI | Ripon | 13–7 |

| No. | Date | Location | Winner | Score |
|---|---|---|---|---|
| 43 | 1942 | Ripon, WI | Lawrence | 21–0 |
| 44 | 1945 | Ripon, WI | Lawrence | 14–7 |
| 45 | 1945 | Appleton, WI | Ripon | 38–7 |
| 46 | 1946 | Appleton, WI | Lawrence | 34–13 |
| 47 | 1947 | Ripon, WI | Lawrence | 34–0 |
| 48 | 1948 | Appleton, WI | Ripon | 19–6 |
| 49 | 1949 | Ripon, WI | Lawrence | 28–7 |
| 50 | 1950 | Appleton, WI | Ripon | 16–14 |
| 51 | 1951 | Ripon, WI | Lawrence | 26–7 |
| 52 | 1952 | Appleton, WI | Lawrence | 12–6 |
| 53 | 1953 | Ripon, WI | Lawrence | 62–0 |
| 54 | 1954 | Appleton, WI | Lawrence | 27–0 |
| 55 | 1955 | Ripon, WI | Tie | 0–0 |
| 56 | 1956 | Appleton, WI | Lawrence | 34–21 |
| 57 | 1957 | Ripon, WI | Ripon | 28–7 |
| 58 | 1958 | Appleton, WI | Ripon | 27–8 |
| 59 | 1959 | Ripon, WI | Ripon | 20–0 |
| 60 | 1960 | Appleton, WI | Lawrence | 13–0 |
| 61 | 1961 | Ripon, WI | Lawrence | 10–0 |
| 62 | 1962 | Appleton, WI | Ripon | 15–14 |
| 63 | 1963 | Ripon, WI | Ripon | 28–0 |
| 64 | 1964 | Appleton, WI | Ripon | 40–6 |
| 65 | 1965 | Ripon, WI | Ripon | 21–3 |
| 66 | 1966 | Appleton, WI | Ripon | 13–7 |
| 67 | 1967 | Ripon, WI | Lawrence | 15–7 |
| 68 | 1968 | Appleton, WI | Ripon | 17–7 |
| 69 | 1969 | Ripon, WI | Lawrence | 27–7 |
| 70 | 1970 | Appleton, WI | Ripon | 20–7 |
| 71 | 1971 | Ripon, WI | Ripon | 21–18 |
| 72 | 1972 | Appleton, WI | Ripon | 35–0 |
| 73 | 1973 | Ripon, WI | Ripon | 22–0 |
| 74 | 1974 | Appleton, WI | Lawrence | 27–14 |
| 75 | 1975 | Ripon, WI | Lawrence | 16–14 |
| 76 | 1976 | Appleton, WI | Ripon | 25–17 |
| 77 | 1977 | Ripon, WI | Ripon | 27–0 |
| 78 | 1978 | Appleton, WI | Lawrence | 35–15 |
| 79 | 1979 | Ripon, WI | Lawrence | 10–7 |
| 80 | 1980 | Appleton, WI | Lawrence | 23–17 |
| 81 | 1981 | Ripon, WI | Lawrence | 23–20 |
| 82 | 1982 | Appleton, WI | Ripon | 23–20 |
| 83 | 1983 | Ripon, WI | Lawrence | 35–21 |
| 84 | 1984 | Appleton, WI | Tie | 13–13 |

| No. | Date | Location | Winner | Score |
|---|---|---|---|---|
| 85 | 1985 | Ripon, WI | Lawrence | 18–0 |
| 86 | 1986 | Appleton, WI | Lawrence | 21–14 |
| 87 | 1987 | Ripon, WI | Lawrence | 22–12 |
| 88 | 1988 | Appleton, WI | Lawrence | 21–3 |
| 89 | 1989 | Ripon, WI | Ripon | 30–0 |
| 90 | 1990 | Appleton, WI | Ripon | 14–6 |
| 91 | 1991 | Ripon, WI | Lawrence | 26–0 |
| 92 | 1992 | Appleton, WI | Ripon | 34–7 |
| 93 | 1993 | Ripon, WI | Lawrence | 28–20 |
| 94 | 1994 | Appleton, WI | Lawrence | 49–34 |
| 95 | 1995 | Ripon, WI | Ripon | 49–35 |
| 96 | 1996 | Appleton, WI | Ripon | 17–6 |
| 97 | 1997 | Ripon, WI | Ripon | 43–24 |
| 98 | 1998 | Ripon, WI | Ripon | 45–42 |
| 99 | 1999 | Appleton, WI | Lawrence | 25–22 |
| 100 | 2000 | Ripon, WI | Ripon | 31–18 |
| 101 | 2001 | Appleton, WI | Ripon | 41–6 |
| 102 | 2002 | Appleton, WI | Ripon | 58–35 |
| 103 | 2003 | Ripon, WI | Ripon | 14–13 |
| 104 | 2004 | Appleton, WI | Ripon | 62–30 |
| 105 | 2005 | Ripon, WI | Ripon | 20–9 |
| 106 | 2006 | Appleton, WI | Ripon | 31–14 |
| 107 | 2007 | Ripon, WI | Ripon | 53–7 |
| 108 | 2008 | Appleton, WI | Ripon | 42–14 |
| 109 | 2009 | Ripon, WI | Ripon | 41–17 |
| 110 | 2010 | Appleton, WI | Ripon | 63–7 |
| 111 | 2011 | Ripon, WI | Ripon | 50–20 |
| 112 | 2012 | Appleton, WI | Ripon | 56–55 |
| 113 | 2013 | Ripon, WI | Ripon | 48–28 |
| 114 | 2014 | Ripon, WI | Ripon | 47–7 |
| 115 | 2015 | Appleton, WI | Ripon | 43–15 |
| 116 | 2016 | Ripon, WI | Ripon | 34–6 |
| 117 | 2017 | Appleton, WI | Ripon | 14–7 |
| 118 | 2018 | Ripon, WI | Ripon | 52–0 |
| 119 | 2019 | Appleton, WI | Ripon | 44–20 |
| 120 | 2022 | Ripon, WI | Ripon | 82–0 |
| 121 | 2023 | Appleton, WI | Ripon | 55–34 |
| 122 | 2024 | Ripon, WI | Ripon | 41–0 |
| 123 | 2025 | Appleton, WI | Ripon | 48–7 |
| 124 | 2026 | Ripon, WI | Ripon | 62–12 |
Series: Ripon leads 71–46–7

== See also ==
- List of NCAA college football rivalry games
