= Ripon Red Hawks =

Athletic teams of Ripon College in the US

- University: Ripon College
- Nickname: Red Hawks
- NCAA: Division III
- Conference: Midwest Conference; North Division
- Athletic director: Chris Schumacher
- Location: Ripon, Wisconsin
- Football stadium: Hopp Stadium
- Basketball arena: Willmore Center
- Colors: Red and White
- Mascot: Rally the Red Hawk
- Fight song: Ripon Fight Song
- Website: riponredhawks.com

The Ripon Red Hawks are the athletic teams of Ripon College. A total of 21 Red Hawks athletic teams compete in NCAA Division III.

== History ==
=== Redmen ===
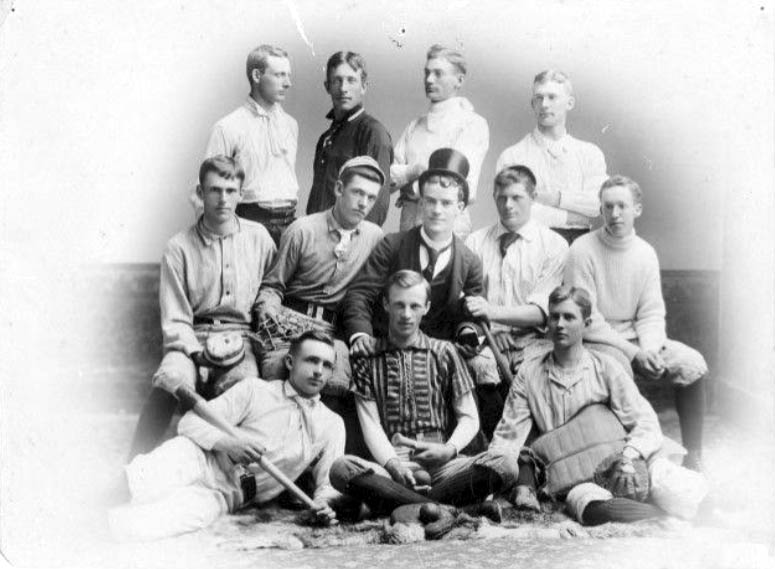
Ripon baseball team c. 1890s

Early Ripon College teams in athletics, and in other activities such as debate, were referred to as the Crimson or Crimson and White. Crimson warriors, Crimson-clad men, and even Crimson tide were popular descriptions, just as opposing teams were referred to as Maroons and Blue and Gold or Navy, in the style of the times.

It is widely believed that the name "Redmen" was adopted because of Donald "Red" Martin, who starred in football as a quarterback, and in basketball and track from 1926 to 1929, and who became a coach of freshman football and basketball in 1930. However, a College Days article of February 7, 1928, indicates that the term Redmen had been used for "several years," and indeed, sportswriters in the Days used the term "Redmen" alongside "Crimson" as early as 1923.

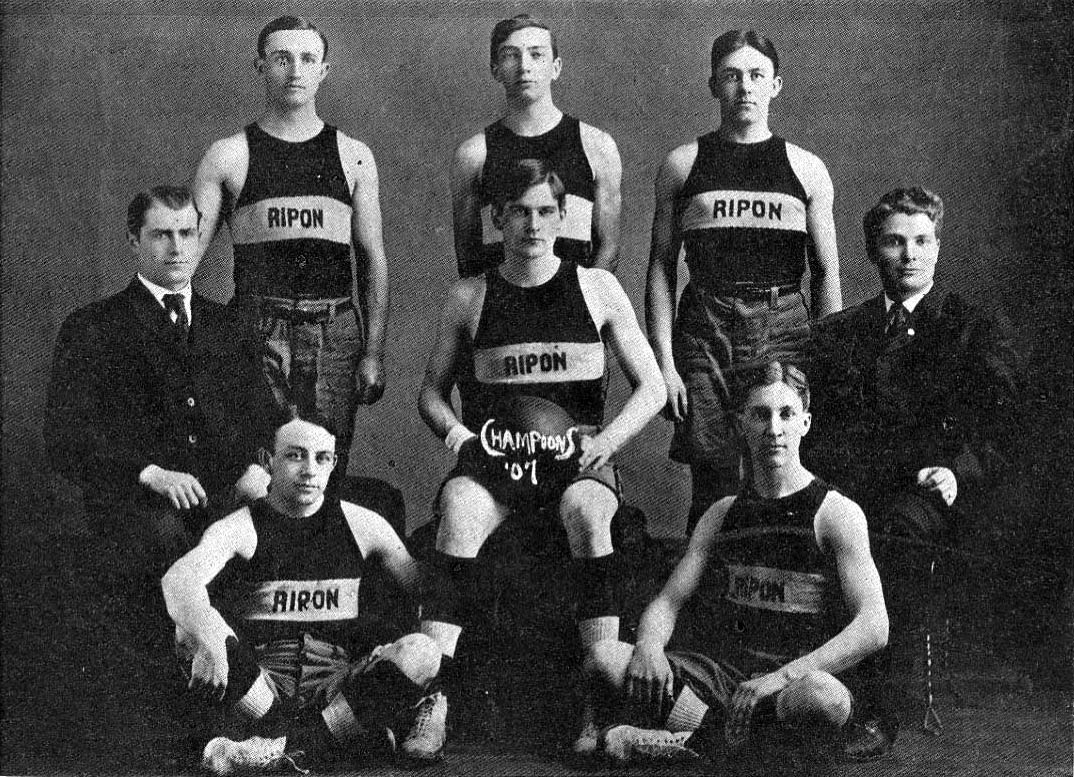
1907 Ripon basketball team

It is commonly asserted that "Redmen" derived from "Red's men," following the convention that referred to teams by their coach's name—usually the coach's last name—"Rippe's men" or "Kolfmen," for instance, after coaches of 1924 to 1930. In fact, College Days articles can be found which refer to the Martinmen for Martin's basketball teams. Coach Doehling was the athletic director and coach of football and other sports when Martin was a player and coach, and those teams were often called the Doehlingmen or Doehlingites. According to George Miller, however, Coach Doehling made his objections to this practice quite clear.

A survey of the Days does not show a direct link from Red Martin to Redman (which, as stated earlier, was used in Days headlines before Martin was a student). During Martin's years, Crimson, Redmen, Doehlingmen, Doehlingites, the Reds and other phrases were used interchangeably, although the term Redmen appeared to gain in use over the term Crimson in the late 1920s and early 1930s. The Days referred to Martin as the Ripon "Redhead" and used his nickname, Red, frequently—a common practice then. The Days did not call the team "Red's men" while Martin was a player and there are only one or two instances of that while he was a coach. No published source has been found that directly links Red's men to Redmen. "Red" Martin's popularity as athlete and coach may have contributed to the increased use of the nickname Redmen. Although, since Coach Doehling was the dominant figure in athletics of that period, it is likely that he influenced the adoption of the name, too. Redmen probably referred, however, simply to the traditional school colors and the name Crimson.

After attention began to be paid to women's athletic activities on campus, some problems occurred with adapting the Redman name to women's teams, which might not have occurred with the use of Crimson. No satisfactory nickname for women's teams seems to have been found. "Redwomen" and "Lady Red" were both used in the 1980s and 1990s.

It is not certain when the Indian-head logo was adopted, but the association of the name Redman with stereotypical Native American imagery was well established between 1924 and 1929 in College Days sports columns, college yells, pep rallies, and homecoming events. The use of the Native American stereotypes appears to have increased as the use of the name Redman became more dominant. At that time, references to scalping the opponents, the Redmen tribe, powwows on the Square and squaws were not apparently seen as offensive, but simply added variety to a sportswriter's pool of clichés or the possibilities for Homecoming themes. Other minorities, of course, were accorded similar treatment in other contexts. These stereotypes continued in varying degrees from then through now: A publication for freshmen women published by the Women's Self-Government Association in 1945-46 was titled The Ripon Squaw; the Indian-head logo appeared on cheerleader outfits into the 1970s and that image still appears on floor mats at Storzer.

In summary, Red Martin's years as a player and coach coincide with the transition to the use of Redmen instead of Crimson for college teams. But, his nickname does not appear to be the direct source of the Redman name, since it was in use before he was a student. Also, the name Redmen apparently did not originate from Native American imagery, but it did become associated with it fairly quickly. The earliest traditional college name was Crimson, a nickname that survives in the college yearbook title today, reflecting the use of Crimson for academic, social and athletic activities in the early years of Ripon College.

=== Red Hawks ===
In the mid-1980s, the college sought to develop an identity program. Though the seal continues to be used as a formal icon of the college, appearing on more formal college publications, stationery, plaques and banners, a more flexible and contemporary image was in demand, according to Douglas Northrop, professor of English and chair of the department and vice president and dean of the college from 1979 to 1994.

Northrop says there was a significant push under William R. Stott Jr., president of the college from 1985 to 1995, to produce a coherent and consistent identity for the college. "Much of the effort was designed to create and to express a pride in the institution, which had regularly kept its light under a basket or at least hidden in the trees," says Northrop.

In 1985, the college hired Rotelli Design, Inc. of Chicago to design a logo that would distinctively convey the traditional image of Ripon College yet be flexible. Rotelli worked with campus officials to produce recommendations to assist Ripon in presenting a consistent, well-defined image to the public. The Ripon College logo type, or Carolus Roman, was adopted at the recommendation of Rotelli and is still used on college publications.

"We worked for a consistent typeface and colors of ink on stationery, posters, brochures and other college objects, including plant department vehicles and other equipment," says Northrop.

Ripon has consistently had a historic affiliation with the color red. At Rotelli's recommendation, a deep red, specifically Pantone Matching System (PMS) color number 201, was adopted as the college's official color.

== Varsity teams ==
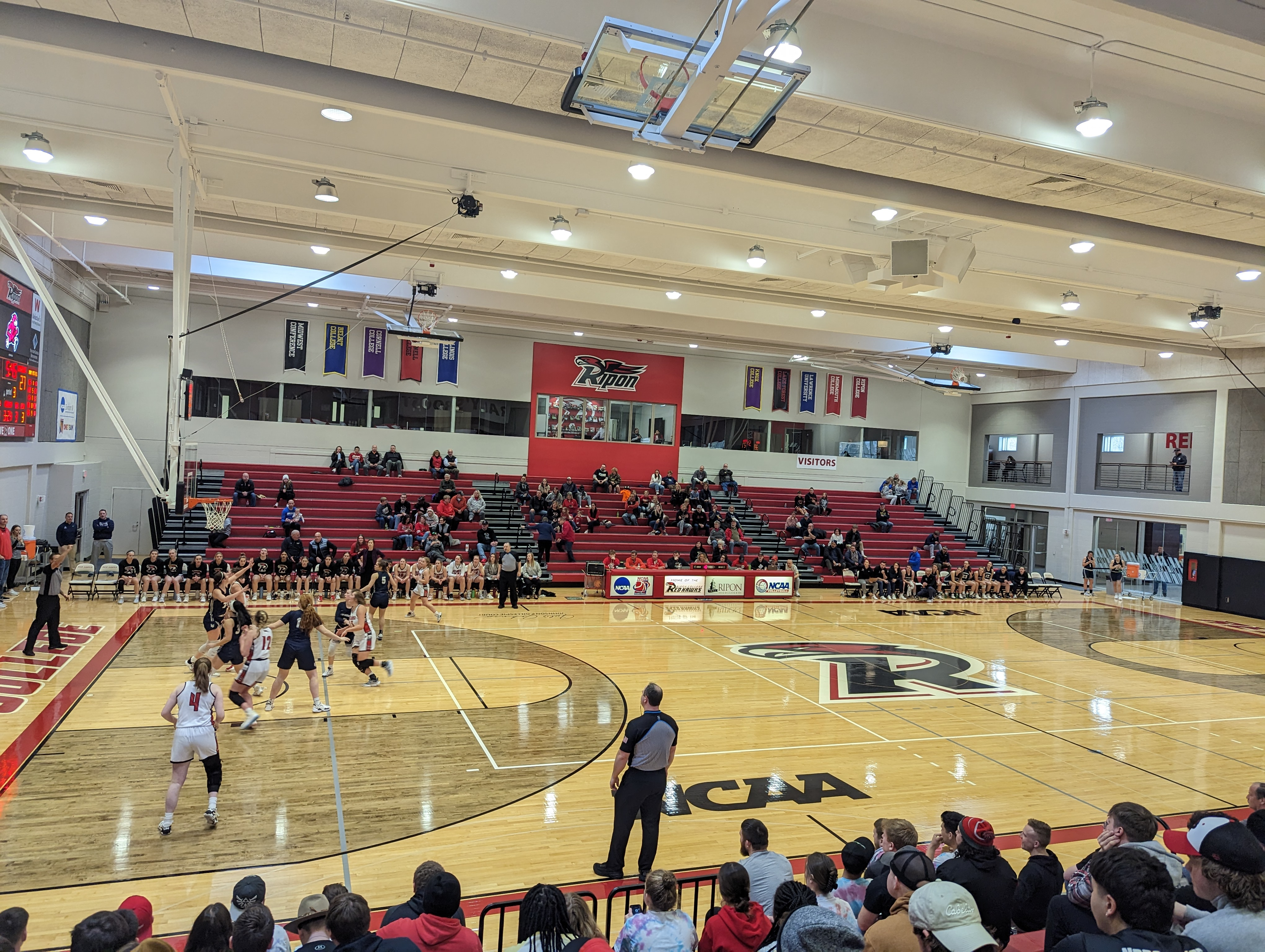
A women's basketball game at Ripon College in the Weiske Gymnasium in the Wilmore Center.

Men's sports	Women's sports
Baseball	Basketball
Basketball	Cross country
Cross country	Flag football
Football	Soccer
Golf	Softball
Soccer	Swimming
Swimming	Tennis
Tennis	Track and field
Track and field	Volleyball
Co-ed sports
e-sports

== Mascot ==
The mascot of Ripon College athletics is known as Rally the Red Hawk, a red anthropomorphic hawk wearing a white shirt with an "R" on it. Rally's first appearance was on October 1, 2011, at a home football game against Knox College.

== Notable people ==
=== Athletes ===
- Dick Bennett, former men's head basketball coach for the University of Wisconsin–Stevens Point, University of Wisconsin–Green Bay, University of Wisconsin–Madison and most recently Washington State University.
- Jenna Breaker, two-time D-III National Champion in the High Jump
- Mike Immel, 1996 D-III National Champion in the Discus
- Dick Rehbein, American football coach in the National Football League.
- Ty Sabin, professional basketball player, led the NCAA in scoring across all Divisions during his four years at Ripon, graduated as the school's all-time leading scorer (2,559), which ranked third in Midwest Conference history at the time of his graduation
- Dave Smith '59, American football player for the Houston Oilers, Named to All-League team in the American Football Conference's first season (1960)
- McKynzee Schepp, the first woman to play, and to score, for the Ripon Red Hawks football team, which occurred on November 11, 2023

=== Coaches ===
- Carl Doehling
- Ron Ernst
- Richard Coles
- Robert Gillespie
