= Greenfield, Iowa =

- City
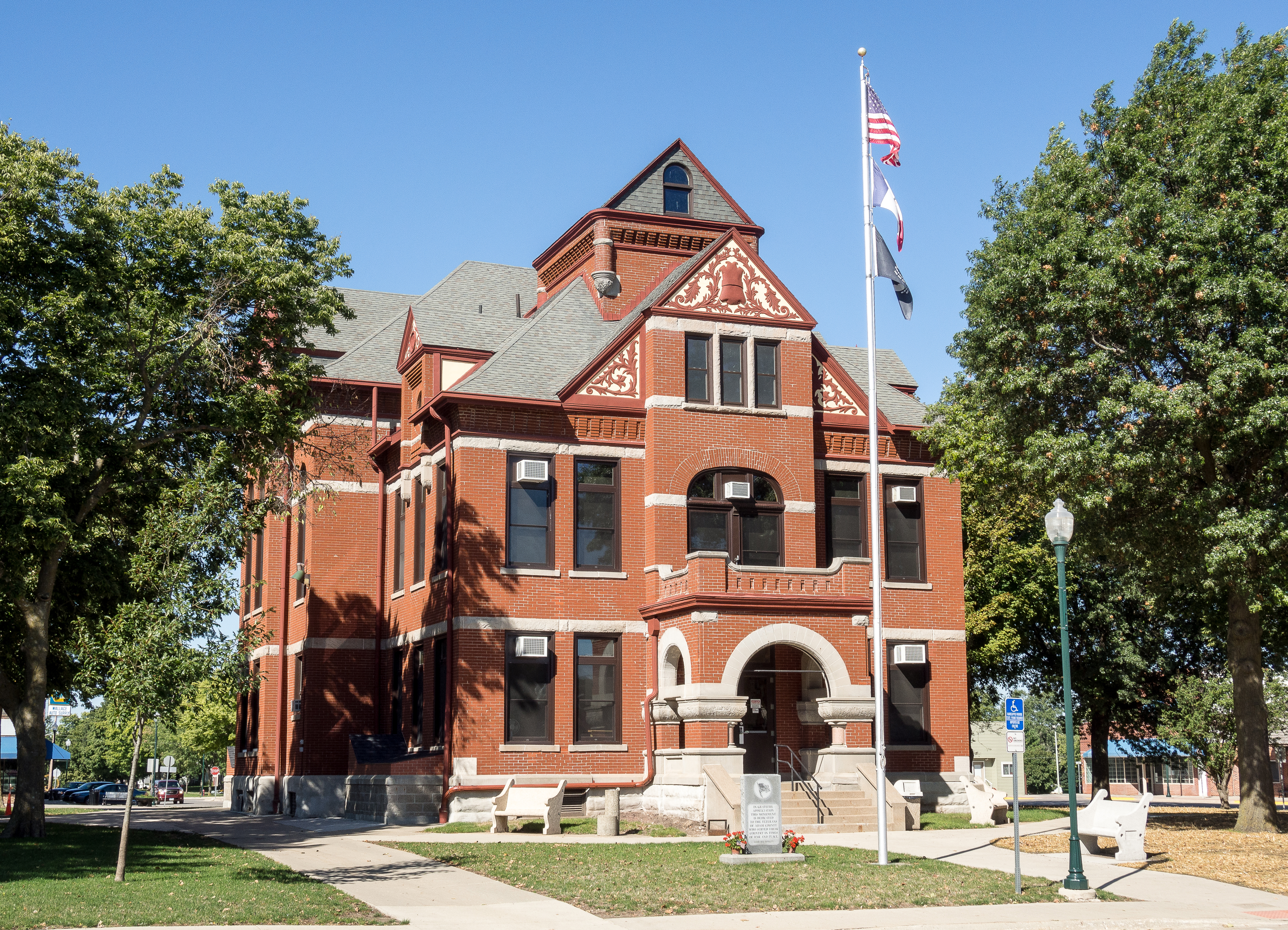
- Adair County Courthouse, listed on National Register of Historic Places

- Icon
- Motto: "There's Nothing Like It"
- Location within Adair County and Iowa
- Coordinates: 41°18′18″N 94°27′40″W
- Country: United States
- State: Iowa
- County: Adair
- Townships: Greenfield, Lee
- Settled: 1854
- Platted: 1856
- Incorporated: May 22, 1876
- Named for: Greenfield, Massachusetts

Area
  - Total: 1.78 sq mi (4.62 km^{2})
  - Land: 1.78 sq mi (4.62 km^{2})
  - Water: 0 sq mi (0.00 km^{2})
- Elevation: 1,375 ft (419 m)

Population (2020)
  - Total: 2,062
  - Density: 1,155.4/sq mi (446.11/km^{2})
- Time zone: UTC−6 (Central (CST))
  - Summer (DST): UTC−5 (CDT)
- ZIP code: 50849
- Area code: 641
- FIPS code: 19-32790
- Website: greenfieldiowa.com

Greenfield is a city in and the county seat of Adair County, Iowa, United States. As of the 2020 census, the city population was 2,062. Greenfield is located in Greenfield and Lee Townships.

== History ==
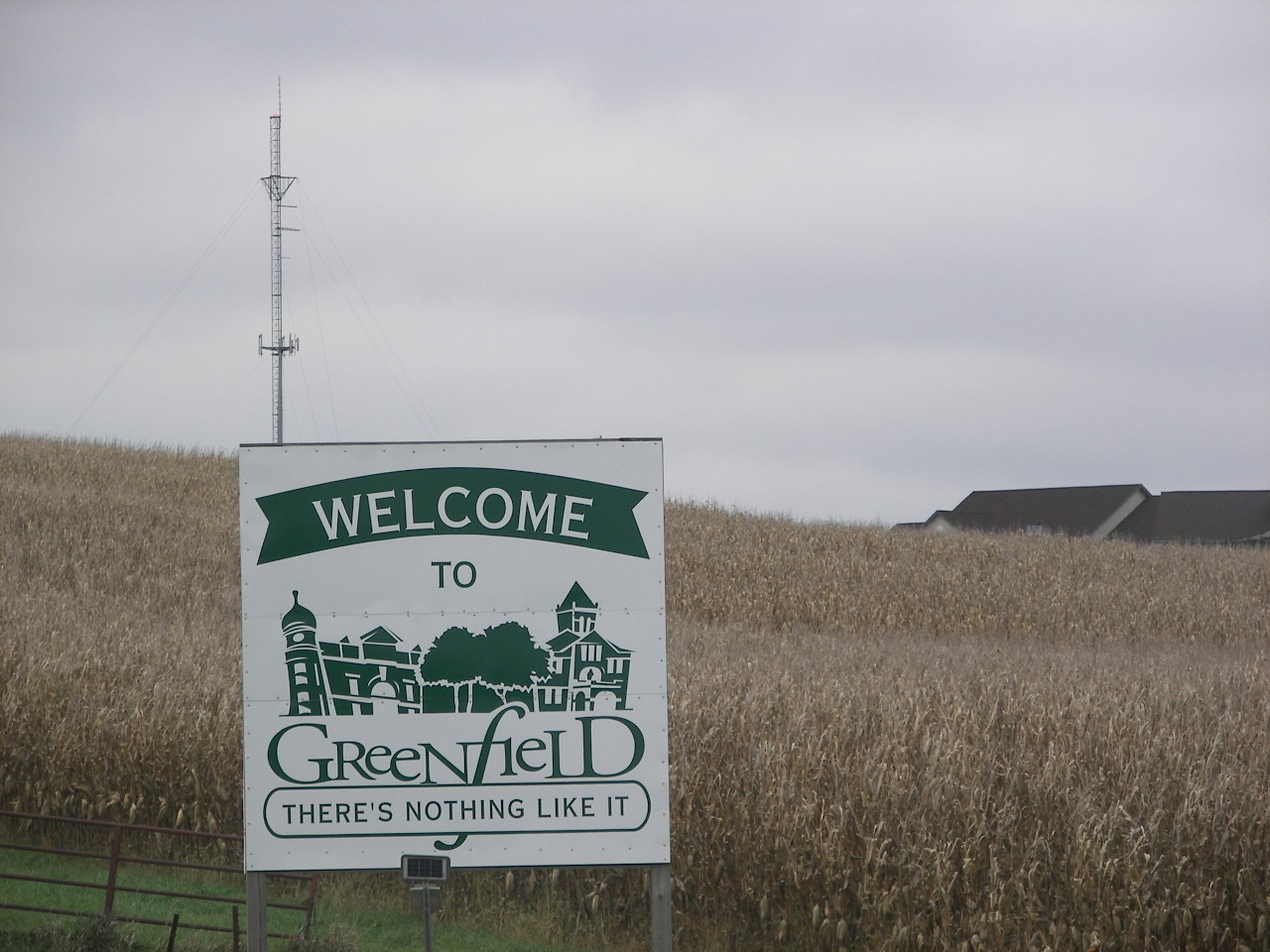
City of Greenfield welcome sign

The area surrounding Greenfield was settled in 1854. The plan for the town of Greenfield was designed in 1856, after Milton C. Munger purchased the land that the town would be built on. Munger is responsible for the design of Greenfield's unique Lancaster-style town square, and the city park located at Grant and NE Second Street was also included in the original plat. Greenfield is named after Greenfield, Massachusetts. Greenfield became the county seat in 1875, after battling out nearby Fontanelle for the title. The city was incorporated on May 22, 1876.

Greenfield is home to four entries on the National Register of Historic Places, the Warren Opera House listed in 1979; the Adair County Courthouse, listed in 1981; the Adair County Democrat/Adair County Free Press building, listed 2011; and Hotel Greenfield, listed 2011.

The Free press building is 19th-century Commercial in style, with Romanesque features on its façade. It was erected in 1903 by Edwin J. Sidey and his father John S. Sidey, founders of the Adair County Democrat in 1889, later the Adair County Free Press. Edwin's son Kenneth (1895–1976) and grandson Edwin J. Sidey (1925–2008) succeeded as publishers and editors. Well-known White House reporter for Time and Life and author Hugh Sidey (1927–2005), brother of Edwin J., was also closely associated over time with the family's journalism and photojournalism legacies. Publisher/Editor Linda E. Sidey, widow of Edwin J., relocated the newspaper business and its associated photo gallery to 141 Public Square in December 2010, after the press had been removed in 1997.

=== 2024 tornado ===
On May 21, 2024, during a significant tornado outbreak affecting parts of the Midwest, Greenfield was struck by a violent EF4 tornado. Many homes were heavily damaged or destroyed, and four were killed and at least 35 others injured in Greenfield. With wind speeds of over 260 mph (420 km/h), this tornado may have produced some of the highest wind speeds ever recorded on earth, radar estimated up to 318 mph (512 km/h) at the ground.

== Geography ==
According to the United States Census Bureau, the city has a total area of 1.81 square miles (4.69 km^{2}), all land.

=== Climate ===
Climate data for Greenfield, Iowa (1991–2020)
Month	Jan	Feb	Mar	Apr	May	Jun	Jul	Aug	Sep	Oct	Nov	Dec	Year
Mean daily maximum °F (°C)	29.6 (−1.3)	34.6 (1.4)	48.2 (9.0)	60.6 (15.9)	70.9 (21.6)	80.4 (26.9)	84.3 (29.1)	82.5 (28.1)	76.0 (24.4)	63.8 (17.7)	47.7 (8.7)	34.4 (1.3)	59.4 (15.2)
Daily mean °F (°C)	20.2 (−6.6)	24.8 (−4.0)	37.6 (3.1)	49.2 (9.6)	60.5 (15.8)	70.3 (21.3)	74.3 (23.5)	72.3 (22.4)	64.7 (18.2)	52.3 (11.3)	37.6 (3.1)	25.4 (−3.7)	49.1 (9.5)
Mean daily minimum °F (°C)	10.8 (−11.8)	15.1 (−9.4)	26.9 (−2.8)	37.7 (3.2)	50.2 (10.1)	60.1 (15.6)	64.2 (17.9)	62.0 (16.7)	53.3 (11.8)	40.8 (4.9)	27.5 (−2.5)	16.5 (−8.6)	38.8 (3.8)
Average precipitation inches (mm)	0.86 (22)	1.25 (32)	1.99 (51)	3.78 (96)	5.31 (135)	4.75 (121)	3.99 (101)	4.36 (111)	3.91 (99)	2.86 (73)	1.99 (51)	1.48 (38)	36.53 (930)
Average snowfall inches (cm)	6.8 (17)	7.3 (19)	3.0 (7.6)	0.8 (2.0)	0.1 (0.25)	0.0 (0.0)	0.0 (0.0)	0.0 (0.0)	0.0 (0.0)	0.4 (1.0)	1.7 (4.3)	5.4 (14)	25.5 (65.15)
Source: NOAA

== Demographics ==
Historical population
Year	Pop.	±%
1880	684	—
1890	1,048	+53.2%
1900	1,300	+24.0%
1910	1,379	+6.1%
1920	1,707	+23.8%
1930	1,837	+7.6%
1940	1,869	+1.7%
1950	2,102	+12.5%
1960	2,243	+6.7%
1970	2,212	−1.4%
1980	2,243	+1.4%
1990	2,074	−7.5%
2000	2,129	+2.7%
2010	1,982	−6.9%
2020	2,062	+4.0%
Iowa Data Center; Source: U.S. Decennial Census

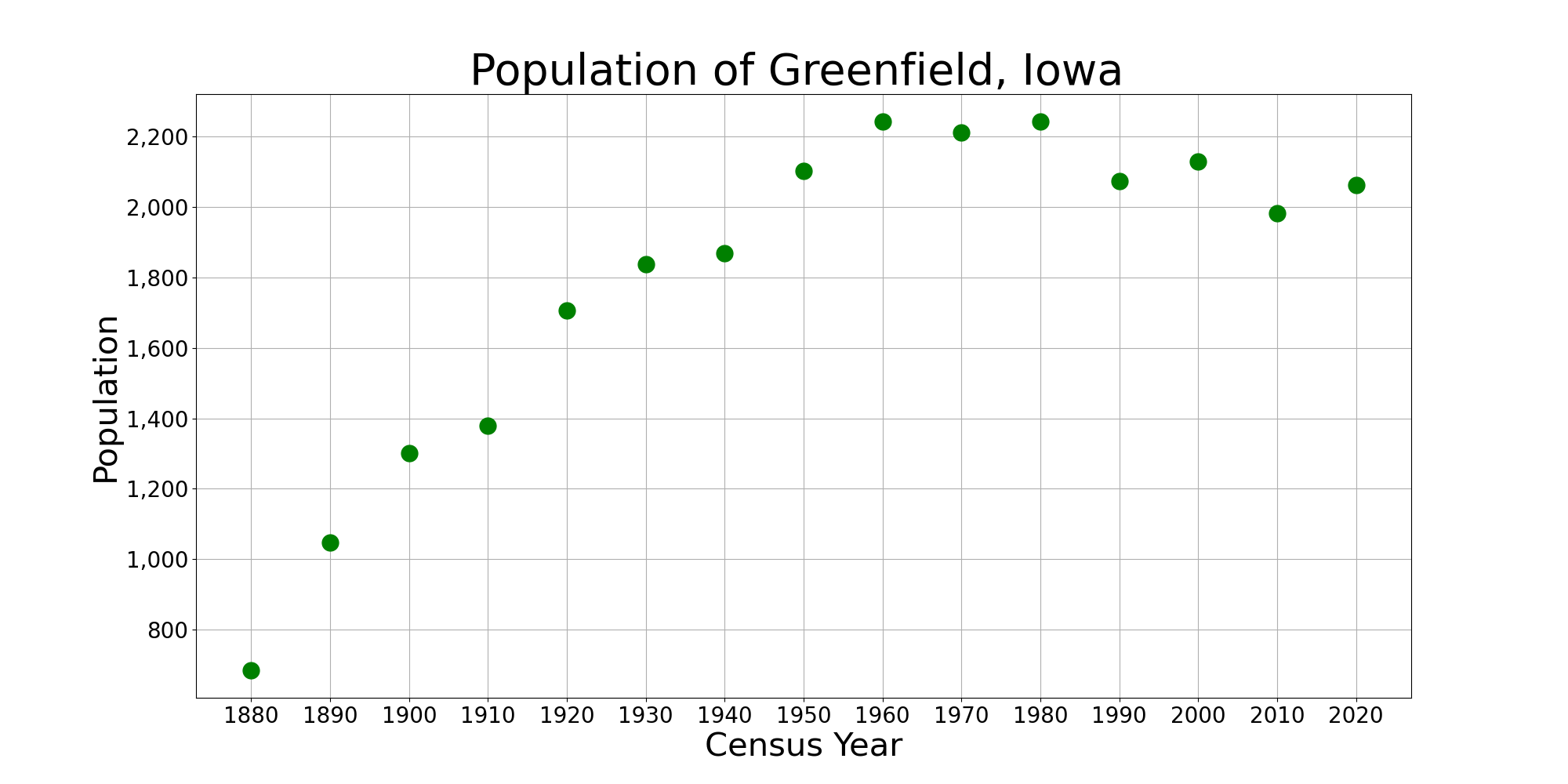
The population of Greenfield, Iowa from US census data

=== 2020 census ===
As of the 2020 census, there were 2,062 people, 945 households, and 553 families residing in the city. The population density was 1,155.4 inhabitants per square mile (446.1/km^{2}). There were 1,007 housing units at an average density of 564.3 per square mile (217.9/km^{2}).

The median age in the city was 42.0 years. 22.7% of residents were under the age of 18, and 23.3% were 65 years of age or older. Age distribution was 25.1% under the age of 20, 3.6% from 20 to 24, 24.1% from 25 to 44, 23.9% from 45 to 64, and 23.3% age 65 or older. For every 100 females, there were 90.2 males, and for every 100 females age 18 and over, there were 84.6 males age 18 and over. The gender makeup of the city was 47.4% male and 52.6% female.

Of the 945 households, 25.6% had children under the age of 18 living with them. Of all households, 41.3% were married-couple households, 7.6% were cohabiting-couple households, 18.7% had a male householder with no spouse or partner present, and 32.4% had a female householder with no spouse or partner present. About 41.5% of all households were non-families, 36.5% were made up of individuals, and 17.3% had someone living alone who was 65 years of age or older.

Of the 1,007 housing units, 6.2% were vacant. The homeowner vacancy rate was 0.2% and the rental vacancy rate was 5.2%. 0.0% of residents lived in urban areas, while 100.0% lived in rural areas.

Racial composition as of the 2020 census
Race	Number	Percent
White	1,975	95.8%
Black or African American	11	0.5%
American Indian and Alaska Native	3	0.1%
Asian	10	0.5%
Native Hawaiian and Other Pacific Islander	2	0.1%
Some other race	11	0.5%
Two or more races	50	2.4%
Hispanic or Latino (of any race)	49	2.4%

=== 2010 census ===
As of the census of 2010, there were 1,982 people, 894 households, and 537 families residing in the city. The population density was 1,095.0 inhabitants per square mile (422.8/km^{2}). There were 1,000 housing units at an average density of 552.5 per square mile (213.3/km^{2}). The racial makeup of the city was 98.0% White, 0.2% African American, 0.1% Native American, 0.4% Asian, 0.8% from other races, and 0.7% from two or more races. Hispanic or Latino of any race were 2.2% of the population.

There were 894 households, of which 25.8% had children under the age of 18 living with them, 48.2% were married couples living together, 8.5% had a female householder with no husband present, 3.4% had a male householder with no wife present, and 39.9% were non-families. Of all households, 35.8% were made up of individuals, and 18.4% had someone living alone who was 65 years of age or older. The average household size was 2.18 and the average family size was 2.81.

The median age in the city was 45.2 years; 22.4% of residents were under the age of 18; 6.8% were between the ages of 18 and 24; 20.6% were from 25 to 44; 26.3% were from 45 to 64; and 24% were 65 years of age or older. The gender makeup of the city was 47.8% male and 52.2% female.

=== 2000 census ===
As of the census of 2000, there were 2,129 people, 937 households, and 580 families residing in the city. The population density was 1,172.6 inhabitants per square mile (452.7/km^{2}). There were 999 housing units at an average density of 550.2 per square mile (212.4/km^{2}). The racial makeup of the city was 99.20% White, 0.05% African American, 0.38% Asian, 0.19% from other races, and 0.19% from two or more races. Hispanic or Latino of any race were 0.42% of the population.

There were 937 households, out of which 26.8% had children under the age of 18 living with them, 52.1% were married couples living together, 6.9% had a female householder with no husband present, and 38.0% were non-families. Of all households, 34.2% were made up of individuals, and 19.9% had someone living alone who was 65 years of age or older. The average household size was 2.20 and the average family size was 2.82.

Age spread: 22.6% under the age of 18, 6.5% from 18 to 24, 24.5% from 25 to 44, 20.4% from 45 to 64, and 26.0% who were 65 years of age or older. The median age was 42 years. For every 100 females, there were 85.3 males. For every 100 females age 18 and over, there were 84.0 males.

The median income for a household in the city was $33,869, and the median income for a family was $42,872. Males had a median income of $29,792 versus $22,091 for females. The per capita income for the city was $19,444. About 7.7% of families and 10.6% of the population were below the poverty line, including 17.0% of those under age 18 and 9.2% of those age 65 or over.

== Economy ==
In 1995, Greenfield became affiliated with the Main Street Iowa program, to rejuvenate the downtown area. The Main Street Approach was developed by the National Trust for Historic Preservation's National Main Street Center with the goal of economic development within the context of historic preservation. Every year Main Street Iowa awards the member communities for their efforts. Greenfield has won awards every year since it became a Main Street town.

== Arts and culture ==
=== Adair County Courthouse ===
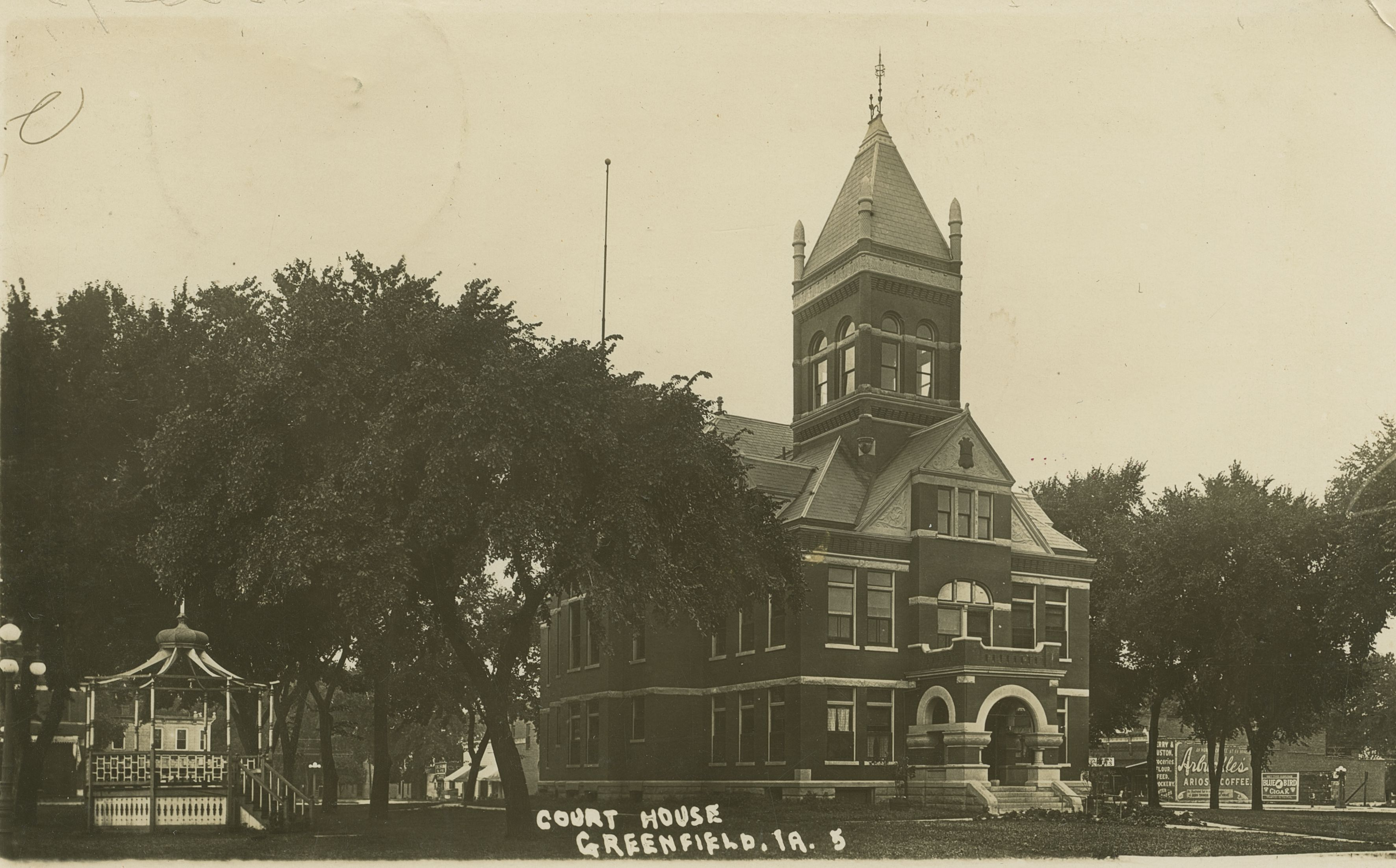
The historic Adair county courthouse with central tower still attached, circa 1890s/early 1900s

Greenfield's unique Courthouse, built in Romanesque style and listed on the National Register of Historic Places in 1981, was constructed in 1891 after the original was destroyed in a fire. The Courthouse was designed by S. E. Maxon. The country's wars have taken their toll on artifacts surrounding the structure. A gazebo on the south lawn was burned during a World War I victory celebration and cannon that once decorated both entrances were melted down during a World War II scrap iron drive.

=== Warren Cultural Center / E. E. Warren Opera House ===
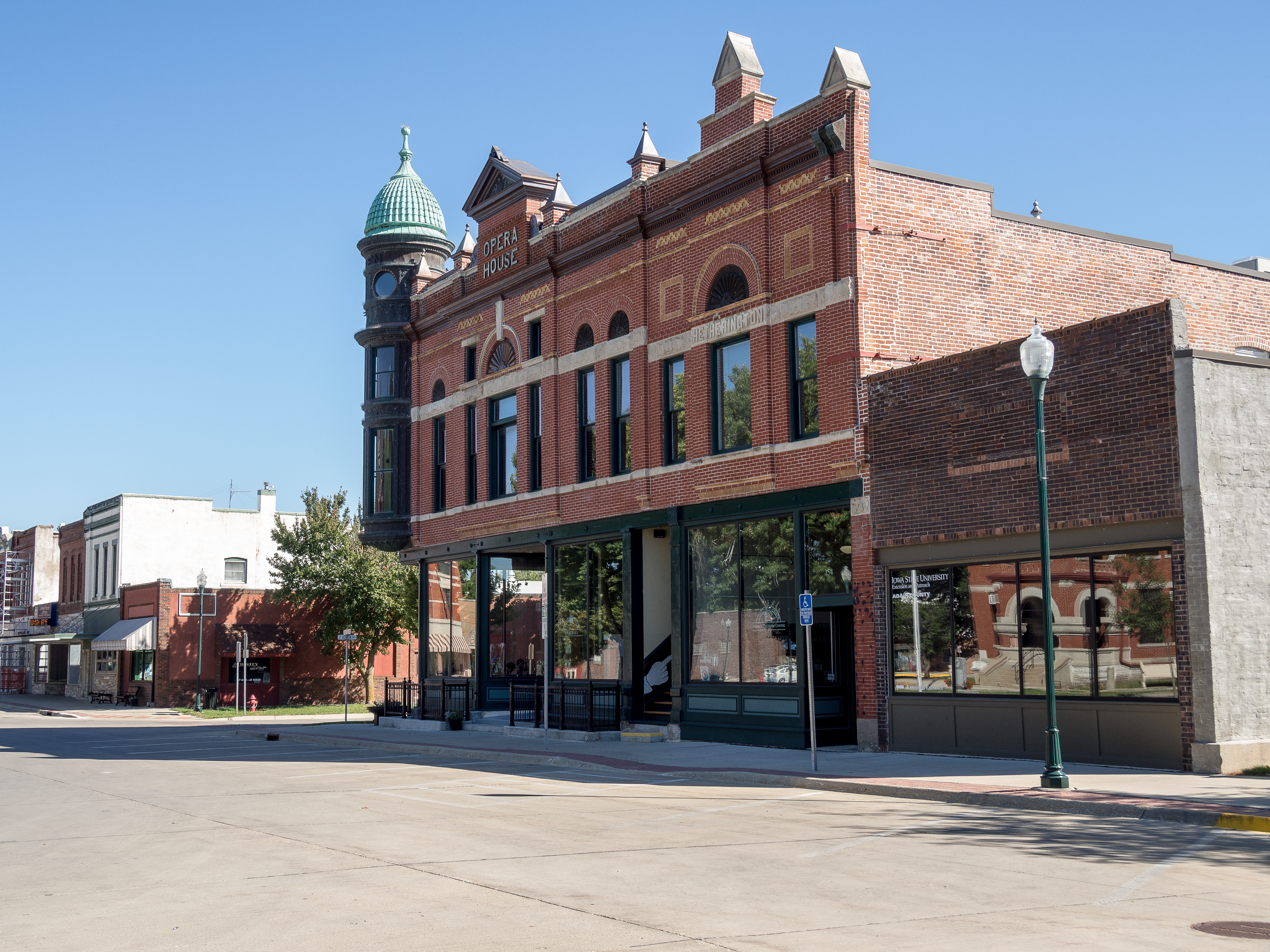
The E. E. Warren Opera House in 2013

The E. E. Warren Opera House was constructed on the site of the old courthouse in 1896. The three-story structure was built by E. E. Warren and his wife, Eva. Edward Earnest Warren was born in New London, Iowa on March 31, 1862. In 1884, Edward married Eva Mary Viers from Fontanelle, Iowa. Eva was born in Washington, Iowa in 1863. The Warrens built their new store and opera house in 1896, in company with John J. Hetherington. Mr Hetherington was born in Pennsylvania in 1842. The idea of a building containing both a store and opera house was first announced in Greenfield in 1895. The building site was formerly occupied by the original courthouse which had burned down. The building's store conducted its grand opening on December 1, 1896. The storefront windows had been curtained until the opening ceremony. At 7:30 pm the curtains were raised and the crowd rushed the door, breaking it from the force. A string quintet provided live music for visitors. Upstairs the Opera House was awaiting its chairs. Mr Warren finally had his own store building. In 1913, the business became titled "Warren Dry Goods Company". Eva worked as the company's bookkeeper. Mr Hetherington was simultaneously building his new store alongside the E. E. Warren Opera House.

In the early years, the Opera House hosted traveling theatrical troupes, medicine shows, musical productions and local theatre. Though the upper floors declined in usage, the ground floor was used as retail space until 1990. The Opera House was listed on the National Register of Historic Places in 1979.

In 1996, the E. E. Warren Opera House Association was formed to save and restore the building and its integrity. The association has made numerous structural and aesthetic improvements to the interior and exterior of the building. The association recently acquired the adjacent Hetherington Building and Taylor Building. The mission of the association is to create a cultural center which will promote all forms of the arts. There will be retail and dining space to enhance the visitor's experience and the facility aims to support live theatre performances, concerts, art exhibits and many more entertaining events. The completed renovation will be known as The Warren Cultural Center, with grand opening in May 2012. Upcoming events can be followed online at http://www.warrenoperahouse.com/

=== Hotel Greenfield ===
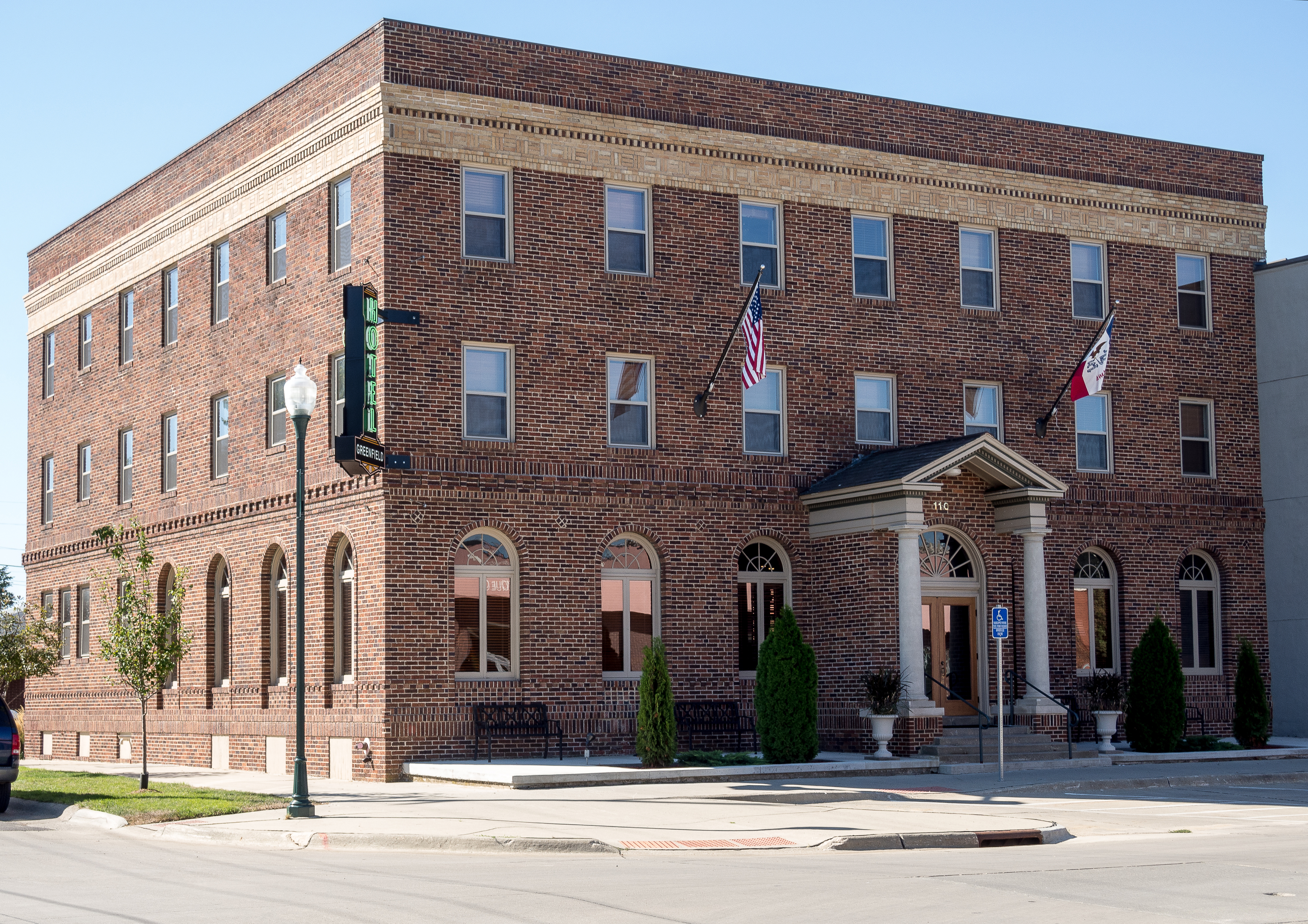
Hotel Greenfield

Hotel Greenfield, operated by ADCO Enterprises, LC, dates to 1920, the city's fourth hotel and the third at 110 East Iowa Street, preceded at this site by The Wilson Hotel and later the Commercial Hotel. It is the largest commercial building in the central business district. Many early hotel patrons traveled to town by the C, B & Q freight-passenger train and were shuttled from the south Greenfield depot. Others arrived by automobile via Iowa's developing highway system.

Despite the shadow of the Great War (WW I) local boosters were yet able to capitalize a 32-room state-of-the-art lodge at a cost of $65,000. Regional architect William Gordon designed the Classical Revival (Commercial) style building, to be constructed starting in 1919. It was completed and furnished by 1920. A gala Grand Opening was featured June 3, 1920, with William Don Carlos and George Musmaker toastmasters of the evening.

The original “Greenfield Hotel Company” of April 8, 1919, was founded by local business owners and town boosters as a community improvement project, more than as a profit-making enterprise, as such. The company, an Iowa corporation, owned the hotel until July 12, 1951. Lawyer George Musmaker, president, and banker Jay Howe, secretary-treasurer, were two of the company's primary leaders during those first 32 years. Individuals and families owned and operated the business after that.

=== Freedom Rock ===
The Freedom Rock is a large boulder that marks the entrance to an old rock quarry. Beginning in 1999, Ray "Bubba" Sorensen II has painted the rock every Memorial Day with different patriotic images and sayings in support of the United States military. There are also several murals throughout Adair County featuring Bubba's patriotic artwork.

=== Iowa Aviation Museum ===
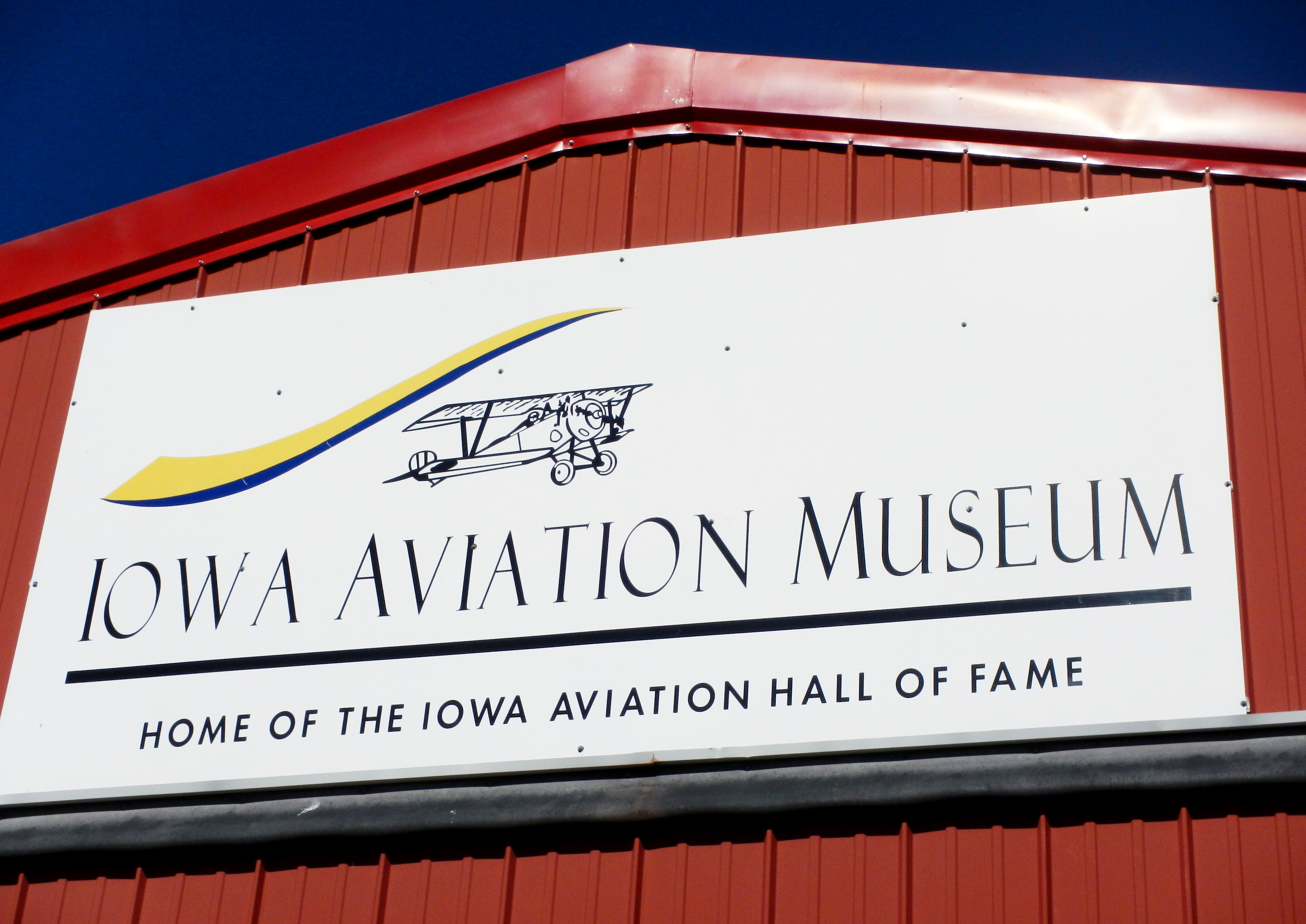
A sign at the entrance of Iowa Aviation Museum

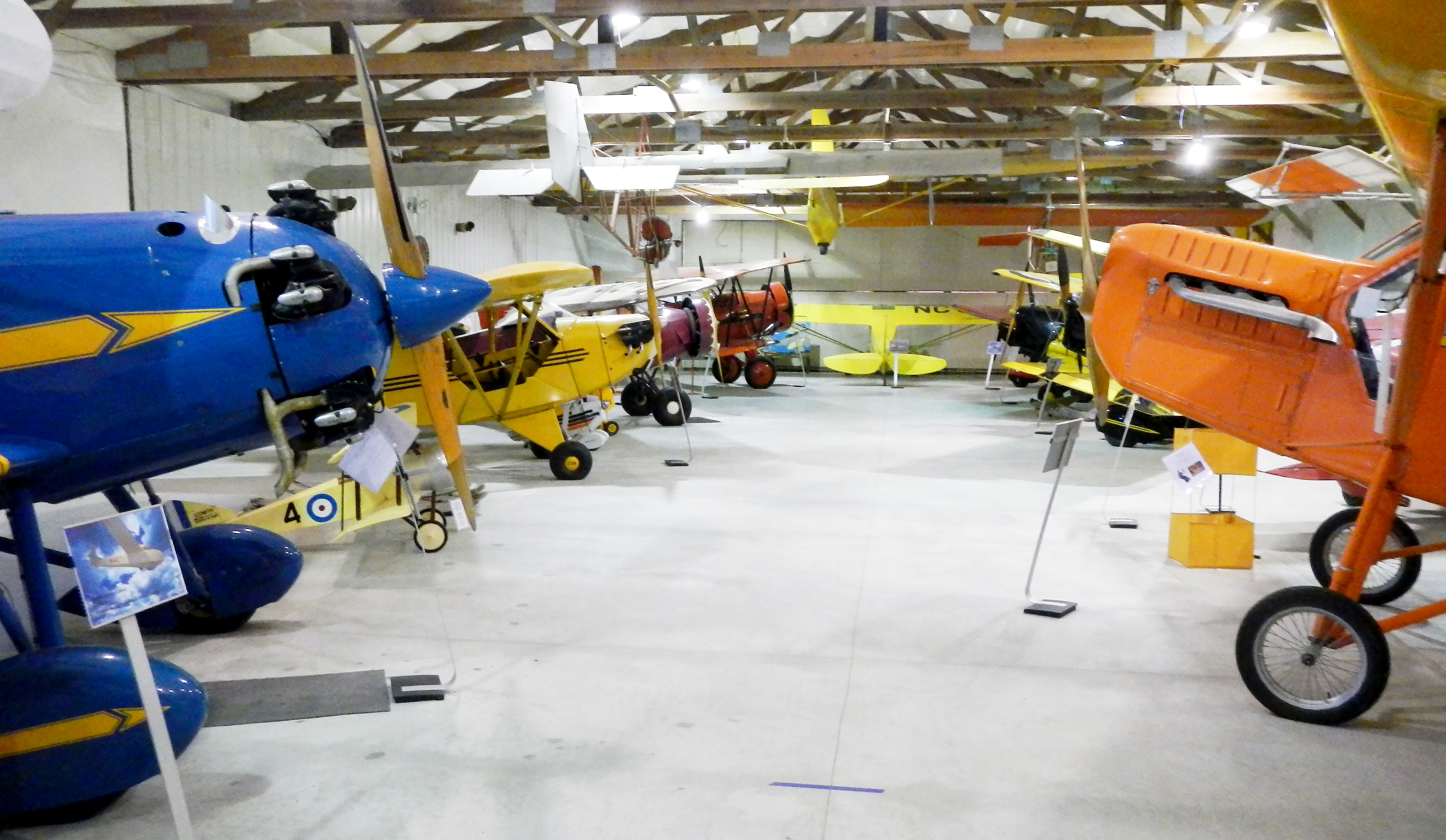
Interior of the Iowa Aviation Museum

The Iowa Aviation Museum celebrates Iowa's aviation heritage from the state's first recorded flight in 1910 to its native sons and daughters exploring the universe.

=== Adair County Heritage Museum Complex ===
Established in 1986, the Adair County Heritage Museum is a five-acre complex dedicated to preserving and display- in the history of Adair County for the benefit and enlightenment of future generations. Located on the west edge of Greenfield, it is operated by the Adair County Historical Society.

=== Schildberg Antique Car Collection ===
Dennis Schildberg, a local car collector, needed a location to house his extensive collection of antique cars. After remodeling an old Ford dealership building, he was able to house his cars and display them for the public to enjoy. He started collecting cars with his wife Marlene in the early 1960s, and since then they have collected over 15 antique vehicles. All the vehicles are in running condition except a 1936 Chevy.

In 1982, Schildberg started restoring the cars. The Schildbergs involve their cars in parades and car shows. Although Schildberg died in 1992, his collection is still available to the public. The museum is open by appointment and for special local events.

== Parks and recreation ==
The Ken Sidey Nature Area is located 2 1/2 miles (4.0 km) miles southwest of Greenfield at 2521 Lewis Avenue. There are 107 acres (43 ha) of timberland and 3 miles (4.8 km) of walking trails. Ken Sidey Nature Area is owned by the Adair County Conservation Board.

== Education ==
Nodaway Valley Community School District serves the community. It was formed on July 1, 2000, by the consolidation of the districts of Greenfield and Bridgewater–Fontanelle.

The district's only high school, Nodaway Valley High School, and the district's only elementary school, Nodaway Valley East Elementary, are in Greenfield.

== Filming location ==
Greenfield was the primary location for the filming of the 1971 satirical comedy film Cold Turkey, produced by Norman Lear, starring Dick Van Dyke. The movie involved a town that accepted a challenge to quit smoking for 30 days. Greenfield also rose to the challenge and went "Cold Turkey" with 166 of its citizens signing Stop Smoking pledges. In 1999, a "Cold Turkey" reunion was held with Lear and several original cast members in attendance. Greenfield and surrounding communities renewed anti-smoking pledges. Portions of the 2009 thriller Peacock were filmed in Greenfield and other towns in Adair County.

== Notable people ==
- Guy Louis Bush, evolutionary biologist
- Waldo Don Carlos, American football player
- Charles B. Hoyt, track and field athlete and coach
- Bill Larson (tight end), American football player
- Hugh Sidey, journalist
