= 1914–15 Army Cadets men's basketball team =

American college basketball season

1914–15 Army Cadets men's basketball
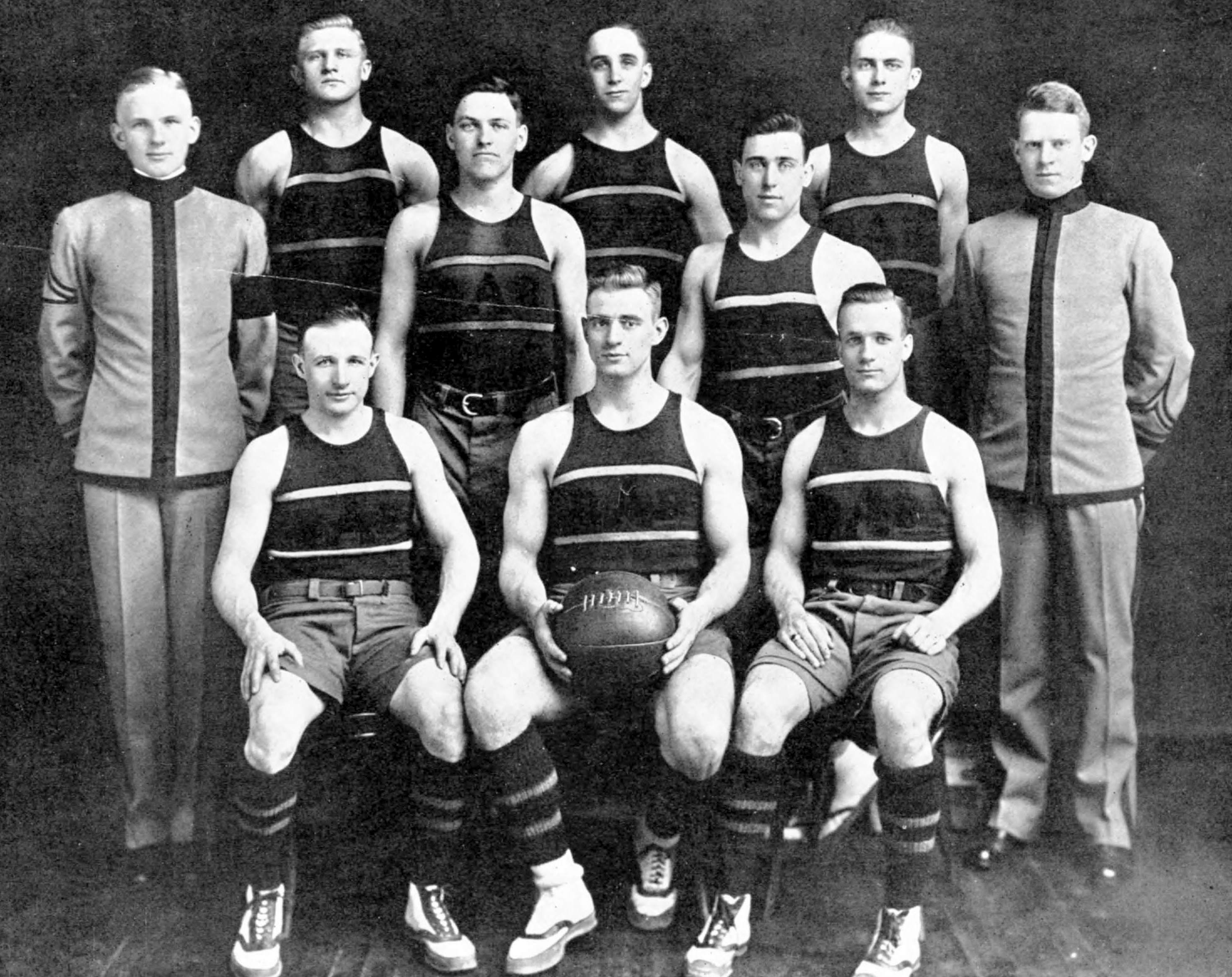
- Conference: Independent
- Record: 11–2
- Head coach: Jacob L. Devers (1st season)
- Captain: Frederic Boye

1914–15 NCAA men's basketball independents standings
	Conf.				Overall
Team	W		L	PCT	W		L	PCT
Arizona		–		–	9	–	0	1.000
California		–		–	6	–	0	1.000
Kalamazoo		–		–	7	–	0	1.000
Virginia		–		–	17	–	0	1.000
St. Joseph's		–		–	14	–	1	.933
Union (N.Y.)		–		–	13	–	1	.929
Lake Forest		–		–	12	–	1	.923
Allegheny		–		–	11	–	1	.917
Louisiana State		–		–	10	–	1	.909
Syracuse		–		–	10	–	1	.909
Santa Clara		–		–	9	–	1	.900
New Mexico		–		–	8	–	1	.889
Seton Hall		–		–	15	–	2	.882
Mount Union		–		–	7	–	1	.875
Denison		–		–	12	–	2	.857
Duquesne		–		–	12	–	2	.857
Washington		–		–	12	–	2	.857
Army		–		–	11	–	2	.846
Carleton		–		–	11	–	2	.846
Whittier		–		–	16	–	3	.842
Franklin		–		–	10	–	2	.833
North Dakota State		–		–	10	–	2	.833
Notre Dame		–		–	14	–	3	.824
Navy		–		–	9	–	2	.818
Tennessee		–		–	9	–	2	.818
VMI		–		–	8	–	2	.800
Washington College		–		–	11	–	3	.786
Pittsburgh		–		–	14	–	4	.778
Wabash		–		–	7	–	2	.778
Penn State		–		–	10	–	3	.769
Central Missouri		–		–	13	–	4	.765
Brigham Young		–		–	6	–	2	.750
Nebraska Wesleyan		–		–	12	–	4	.750
St. John's (NY)		–		–	12	–	4	.750
Utah		–		–	12	–	4	.750
Wake Forest		–		–	12	–	4	.750
Washington State		–		–	17	–	6	.739
Colgate		–		–	11	–	4	.733
Millikin		–		–	11	–	4	.733
Ohio		–		–	11	–	4	.733
Bradley		–		–	13	–	5	.722
The Citadel		–		–	5	–	2	.714
Grinnell		–		–	10	–	4	.714
Manhattan		–		–	10	–	4	.714
Nevada		–		–	5	–	2	.714
Oklahoma A&M		–		–	10	–	4	.714
Roanoke		–		–	10	–	4	.714
Muhlenberg		–		–	12	–	5	.706
Temple		–		–	9	–	4	.692
Virginia Tech		–		–	9	–	4	.692
Grove City		–		–	13	–	6	.684
Northern Colorado		–		–	2	–	1	.667
Southwestern (Kan.)		–		–	10	–	5	.667
Tulsa		–		–	6	–	3	.667
Alabama		–		–	7	–	4	.636
Augustana (Ill.)		–		–	7	–	4	.636
North Dakota		–		–	7	–	4	.636
Millsaps		–		–	5	–	3	.625
Rochester (N.Y.)		–		–	10	–	6	.625
Saint Mary's (Calif.)		–		–	5	–	3	.625
Kent State		–		–	3	–	2	.600
Kentucky		–		–	7	–	5	.583
Oklahoma		–		–	7	–	5	.583
Western State Normal		–		–	7	–	5	.583
Georgia		–		–	4	–	3	.571
Loyola (Md.)		–		–	8	–	6	.571
Mississippi A&M		–		–	8	–	6	.571
Lehigh		–		–	9	–	7	.563
Indiana State		–		–	7	–	6	.538
Fordham		–		–	17	–	15	.531
Tempe Normal		–		–	2	–	2	.500
Canisius		–		–	5	–	5	.500
Davidson		–		–	3	–	3	.500
Dayton		–		–	4	–	4	.500
Georgetown		–		–	8	–	8	.500
Trinity (N.C.)		–		–	10	–	10	.500
Gettysburg		–		–	9	–	9	.500
Marietta		–		–	7	–	7	.500
New York University		–		–	6	–	6	.500
North Carolina State		–		–	5	–	5	.500
Oregon Agricultural		–		–	10	–	10	.500
Vanderbilt		–		–	6	–	6	.500
West Virginia		–		–	10	–	10	.500
Wisconsin–Stevens Point		–		–	5	–	5	.500
TCU		–		–	11	–	12	.478
Niagara		–		–	8	–	9	.471
Washburn		–		–	5	–	6	.455
Louisville		–		–	4	–	5	.444
Stanford		–		–	4	–	5	.444
Michigan State		–		–	7	–	9	.438
Butler		–		–	3	–	4	.429
William & Mary		–		–	5	–	8	.385
New Mexico A&M		–		–	3	–	4	.429
Springfield (Mass.)		–		–	6	–	8	.429
CCNY		–		–	5	–	7	.417
Delaware		–		–	5	–	7	.417
Oregon		–		–	7	–	10	.412
Montana		–		–	4	–	6	.400
Montana State		–		–	4	–	6	.400
Tulane		–		–	2	–	3	.400
Washington & Jefferson		–		–	4	–	6	.400
Washington and Lee		–		–	5	–	8	.385
William & Mary		–		–	5	–	8	.385
Auburn		–		–	3	–	5	.375
Detroit		–		–	3	–	5	.375
North Carolina		–		–	6	–	10	.375
Richmond		–		–	3	–	5	.375
George Washington		–		–	5	–	9	.357
Idaho		–		–	5	–	9	.357
Southern California		–		–	3	–	6	.333
Wooster		–		–	5	–	10	.333
Wyoming		–		–	2	–	4	.333
Bucknell		–		–	5	–	11	.313
Miami (Ohio)		–		–	4	–	9	.308
Clemson		–		–	2	–	5	.286
Lafayette		–		–	4	–	10	.286
Fairmount		–		–	4	–	10	.286
Cincinnati		–		–	3	–	8	.273
South Carolina		–		–	2	–	7	.222
Connecticut		–		–	1	–	4	.200
Akron		–		–	2	–	10	.167
Utah State		–		–	1	–	5	.167
Rutgers		–		–	1	–	8	.111
Ole Miss		–		–	0	–	3	.000

The 1914–15 Army Cadets men's basketball team represented United States Military Academy during the 1914–15 college men's basketball season. The head coach was Joseph Stilwell, coaching his first season with the Cadets. The team captain was John MacTaggart.

== Schedule ==
Date time, TV	Opponent	Result	Record	Site city, state
	Fordham	W 34–15	1–0	West Point, NY
	St. Lawrence	W 23–10	2–0	West Point, NY
12/19/1914	Georgetown	W 20–03	3–0	West Point, NY
	Pennsylvania	L 17–23	3–1	West Point, NY
	Union	L 12–21	3–2	West Point, NY
	Manhattan	W 24–16	4–2	West Point, NY
	Swarthmore	W 29–13	5–2	West Point, NY
	Lehigh	W 19–06	6–2	West Point, NY
	Pittsburgh	W 25–19	7–2	West Point, NY
2/13/1915	Syracuse	W 28–12	8–2	West Point, NY
2/20/1915	Cornell	W 15–11	9–2	West Point, NY
	George Washington	W 24–15	10–2	West Point, NY
	Washington & Lee	W 44–20	11–2	West Point, NY
*Non-conference game. (#) Tournament seedings in parentheses.
