= 1914–15 Georgetown Hoyas men's basketball team =

American college basketball season

1914–15 Georgetown Hoyas men's basketball
- Conference: Independent
- Record: 8–8
- Head coach: John O'Reilly (1st season)
- Captain: Harry Kelly
- Home arena: Ryan Gymnasium

1914–15 NCAA men's basketball independents standings
| | Conf. | | | | Overall |
| Team | W | | L | PCT | W | | L | PCT |
|---|---|---|---|---|---|---|---|---|
| Arizona | | – | | – | 9 | – | 0 | 1.000 |
| California | | – | | – | 6 | – | 0 | 1.000 |
| Kalamazoo | | – | | – | 7 | – | 0 | 1.000 |
| Virginia | | – | | – | 17 | – | 0 | 1.000 |
| St. Joseph's | | – | | – | 14 | – | 1 | .933 |
| Union (N.Y.) | | – | | – | 13 | – | 1 | .929 |
| Lake Forest | | – | | – | 12 | – | 1 | .923 |
| Allegheny | | – | | – | 11 | – | 1 | .917 |
| Louisiana State | | – | | – | 10 | – | 1 | .909 |
| Syracuse | | – | | – | 10 | – | 1 | .909 |
| Santa Clara | | – | | – | 9 | – | 1 | .900 |
| New Mexico | | – | | – | 8 | – | 1 | .889 |
| Seton Hall | | – | | – | 15 | – | 2 | .882 |
| Mount Union | | – | | – | 7 | – | 1 | .875 |
| Denison | | – | | – | 12 | – | 2 | .857 |
| Duquesne | | – | | – | 12 | – | 2 | .857 |
| Washington | | – | | – | 12 | – | 2 | .857 |
| Army | | – | | – | 11 | – | 2 | .846 |
| Carleton | | – | | – | 11 | – | 2 | .846 |
| Whittier | | – | | – | 16 | – | 3 | .842 |
| Franklin | | – | | – | 10 | – | 2 | .833 |
| North Dakota State | | – | | – | 10 | – | 2 | .833 |
| Notre Dame | | – | | – | 14 | – | 3 | .824 |
| Navy | | – | | – | 9 | – | 2 | .818 |
| Tennessee | | – | | – | 9 | – | 2 | .818 |
| VMI | | – | | – | 8 | – | 2 | .800 |
| Washington College | | – | | – | 11 | – | 3 | .786 |
| Pittsburgh | | – | | – | 14 | – | 4 | .778 |
| Wabash | | – | | – | 7 | – | 2 | .778 |
| Penn State | | – | | – | 10 | – | 3 | .769 |
| Central Missouri | | – | | – | 13 | – | 4 | .765 |
| Brigham Young | | – | | – | 6 | – | 2 | .750 |
| Nebraska Wesleyan | | – | | – | 12 | – | 4 | .750 |
| St. John's (NY) | | – | | – | 12 | – | 4 | .750 |
| Utah | | – | | – | 12 | – | 4 | .750 |
| Wake Forest | | – | | – | 12 | – | 4 | .750 |
| Washington State | | – | | – | 17 | – | 6 | .739 |
| Colgate | | – | | – | 11 | – | 4 | .733 |
| Millikin | | – | | – | 11 | – | 4 | .733 |
| Ohio | | – | | – | 11 | – | 4 | .733 |
| Bradley | | – | | – | 13 | – | 5 | .722 |
| The Citadel | | – | | – | 5 | – | 2 | .714 |
| Grinnell | | – | | – | 10 | – | 4 | .714 |
| Manhattan | | – | | – | 10 | – | 4 | .714 |
| Nevada | | – | | – | 5 | – | 2 | .714 |
| Oklahoma A&M | | – | | – | 10 | – | 4 | .714 |
| Roanoke | | – | | – | 10 | – | 4 | .714 |
| Muhlenberg | | – | | – | 12 | – | 5 | .706 |
| Temple | | – | | – | 9 | – | 4 | .692 |
| Virginia Tech | | – | | – | 9 | – | 4 | .692 |
| Grove City | | – | | – | 13 | – | 6 | .684 |
| Northern Colorado | | – | | – | 2 | – | 1 | .667 |
| Southwestern (Kan.) | | – | | – | 10 | – | 5 | .667 |
| Tulsa | | – | | – | 6 | – | 3 | .667 |
| Alabama | | – | | – | 7 | – | 4 | .636 |
| Augustana (Ill.) | | – | | – | 7 | – | 4 | .636 |
| North Dakota | | – | | – | 7 | – | 4 | .636 |
| Millsaps | | – | | – | 5 | – | 3 | .625 |
| Rochester (N.Y.) | | – | | – | 10 | – | 6 | .625 |
| Saint Mary's (Calif.) | | – | | – | 5 | – | 3 | .625 |
| Kent State | | – | | – | 3 | – | 2 | .600 |
| Kentucky | | – | | – | 7 | – | 5 | .583 |
| Oklahoma | | – | | – | 7 | – | 5 | .583 |
| Western State Normal | | – | | – | 7 | – | 5 | .583 |
| Georgia | | – | | – | 4 | – | 3 | .571 |
| Loyola (Md.) | | – | | – | 8 | – | 6 | .571 |
| Mississippi A&M | | – | | – | 8 | – | 6 | .571 |
| Lehigh | | – | | – | 9 | – | 7 | .563 |
| Indiana State | | – | | – | 7 | – | 6 | .538 |
| Fordham | | – | | – | 17 | – | 15 | .531 |
| Tempe Normal | | – | | – | 2 | – | 2 | .500 |
| Canisius | | – | | – | 5 | – | 5 | .500 |
| Davidson | | – | | – | 3 | – | 3 | .500 |
| Dayton | | – | | – | 4 | – | 4 | .500 |
| Georgetown | | – | | – | 8 | – | 8 | .500 |
| Trinity (N.C.) | | – | | – | 10 | – | 10 | .500 |
| Gettysburg | | – | | – | 9 | – | 9 | .500 |
| Marietta | | – | | – | 7 | – | 7 | .500 |
| New York University | | – | | – | 6 | – | 6 | .500 |
| North Carolina State | | – | | – | 5 | – | 5 | .500 |
| Oregon Agricultural | | – | | – | 10 | – | 10 | .500 |
| Vanderbilt | | – | | – | 6 | – | 6 | .500 |
| West Virginia | | – | | – | 10 | – | 10 | .500 |
| Wisconsin–Stevens Point | | – | | – | 5 | – | 5 | .500 |
| TCU | | – | | – | 11 | – | 12 | .478 |
| Niagara | | – | | – | 8 | – | 9 | .471 |
| Washburn | | – | | – | 5 | – | 6 | .455 |
| Louisville | | – | | – | 4 | – | 5 | .444 |
| Stanford | | – | | – | 4 | – | 5 | .444 |
| Michigan State | | – | | – | 7 | – | 9 | .438 |
| Butler | | – | | – | 3 | – | 4 | .429 |
| William & Mary | | – | | – | 5 | – | 8 | .385 |
| New Mexico A&M | | – | | – | 3 | – | 4 | .429 |
| Springfield (Mass.) | | – | | – | 6 | – | 8 | .429 |
| CCNY | | – | | – | 5 | – | 7 | .417 |
| Delaware | | – | | – | 5 | – | 7 | .417 |
| Oregon | | – | | – | 7 | – | 10 | .412 |
| Montana | | – | | – | 4 | – | 6 | .400 |
| Montana State | | – | | – | 4 | – | 6 | .400 |
| Tulane | | – | | – | 2 | – | 3 | .400 |
| Washington & Jefferson | | – | | – | 4 | – | 6 | .400 |
| Washington and Lee | | – | | – | 5 | – | 8 | .385 |
| William & Mary | | – | | – | 5 | – | 8 | .385 |
| Auburn | | – | | – | 3 | – | 5 | .375 |
| Detroit | | – | | – | 3 | – | 5 | .375 |
| North Carolina | | – | | – | 6 | – | 10 | .375 |
| Richmond | | – | | – | 3 | – | 5 | .375 |
| George Washington | | – | | – | 5 | – | 9 | .357 |
| Idaho | | – | | – | 5 | – | 9 | .357 |
| Southern California | | – | | – | 3 | – | 6 | .333 |
| Wooster | | – | | – | 5 | – | 10 | .333 |
| Wyoming | | – | | – | 2 | – | 4 | .333 |
| Bucknell | | – | | – | 5 | – | 11 | .313 |
| Miami (Ohio) | | – | | – | 4 | – | 9 | .308 |
| Clemson | | – | | – | 2 | – | 5 | .286 |
| Lafayette | | – | | – | 4 | – | 10 | .286 |
| Fairmount | | – | | – | 4 | – | 10 | .286 |
| Cincinnati | | – | | – | 3 | – | 8 | .273 |
| South Carolina | | – | | – | 2 | – | 7 | .222 |
| Connecticut | | – | | – | 1 | – | 4 | .200 |
| Akron | | – | | – | 2 | – | 10 | .167 |
| Utah State | | – | | – | 1 | – | 5 | .167 |
| Rutgers | | – | | – | 1 | – | 8 | .111 |
| Ole Miss | | – | | – | 0 | – | 3 | .000 |

The 1914–15 Georgetown Hoyas men's basketball team represented Georgetown University during the 1914-15 NCAA college basketball season. John O'Reilly coached the team in his first season as head coach. Georgetown was an independent and played its home games at Ryan Gymnasium on the Georgetown campus in Washington, D.C., and finished the season with a record of 8–8.

New head coach O'Reilly coached three sports at Georgetown – basketball, baseball, and track – and was destined to coach the basketball team to some of its great early triumphs. He would coach the team for 11 seasons, interrupted by a hiatus during the 1921–22 and 1922–23 seasons due to illness, and post an overall record of 87–47. His tenure would see most of a 52-game home winning streak at Ryan Gymnasium between the final game of the 1916–17 season and midway through the 1923–24 season that included victories over top national teams North Carolina (twice), Georgia Tech, and Kentucky. Fifteen of the 19 straight victories over George Washington also would occur with him at the helm.

== Season recap ==
The move to Ryan Gymnasium meant that this was the first Georgetown men's basketball team to play its games on campus. Opened in 1906, when competitive college basketball was just beginning at Georgetown, Ryan had not been intended to host competitive sporting events; it had no seating, accommodating fans on a standing-room-only basis on an indoor track above the basketball court. This precluded large crowds at the Hoyas' home games despite the team's home success during the 13 years at Ryan, limiting revenue for the self-sustaining Basketball Association, which funded the team's travel expenses. Despite this drawback, Ryan would serve as the Hoyas' home court through the end of the 1926–27 season, although from the 1918–19 season through 1926–27 the Hoyas would play very few road games in order to keep travel expenses to a bare minimum.

Georgetown defeated crosstown rival George Washington twice this season, the first of 19 straight wins over George Washington before George Washington suspended the series after the 1923–24 season.

== Roster ==
Georgetown players did not wear numbers on their jerseys this season. The first numbered jerseys in Georgetown men's basketball history would not appear until the 1933–34 season.

| Name | Height | Weight (lbs.) | Position | Class | Hometown | Previous Team(s) |
|---|---|---|---|---|---|---|
| Gerald "Gerry" Curry | N/A | N/A | G | Jr. | N/A | N/A |
| Matt Donnelly | N/A | N/A | G | Jr. | N/A | N/A |
| Fred Flanagan | N/A | N/A | F | Jr. | N/A | N/A |
| Sam Foley | N/A | N/A | G | Sr. | N/A | N/A |
| Harry "King" Kelly | N/A | N/A | G | Jr. | N/A | N/A |
| Leo Klauberg | N/A | N/A | F | Jr. | N/A | N/A |
| Bob O'Lone | N/A | N/A | F | Fr. | N/A | N/A |
| Johnny Shugrue | N/A | N/A | F | Sr. | Washington, DC, U.S. | Georgetown Preparatory School (North Bethesda, MD) |
| Jim Tormey | N/A | N/A | C | Sr. | Baltimore, MD, U.S. | Loyola College (Md.) |
| William "Bill" Valk | N/A | N/A | G | Sr. | Washington, DC, U.S. | Central HS |

== 1914–15 schedule and results ==
| Date time, TV | Opponent | Result | Record | Site city, state |
Regular Season
| Wed., Dec. 9, 1914 no, no | Mount St. Joseph | W 34–18 | 1-0 | Ryan Gymnasium; Washington, DC |
| Thu., Dec. 17, 1914 no, no | at Seton Hall | L 13–38 | 1-1 | N/A; South Orange, NJ |
| Fri., Dec. 18, 1914 no, no | at Fordham | L 28–31 | 1-2 | N/A; New York, NY |
| Sat., Dec. 19, 1914 no, no | at Army | L 3–20 | 1-3 | N/A; West Point, NY |
| N/A no, no | at New York University | L 21–38 | 1-4 | N/A; New York, NY |
| Fri., Jan. 15, 1915 no, no | West Virginia Wesleyan | W 27–24 | 2-4 | Ryan Gymnasium; Washington, DC |
| Wed., Jan. 20, 1915 no, no | Virginia Tech | W 25–21 | 3-4 | Ryan Gymnasium; Washington, DC |
| Sat., Jan. 23, 1915 no, no | at Washington and Lee | L 23–32 | 3-5 | N/A; Lexington, VA |
| Tue., Jan. 26, 1915 no, no | at Mount St. Joseph | L 21–28 | 3-6 | Mount St. Joseph Gymnasium; Baltimore, MD |
| Sat., Jan. 30, 1915 no, no | at Navy | L 7–46 | 3-7 | Dahlgren Hall; Annapolis, MD |
| Fri., Feb. 5, 1915 no, no | Fordham | W 31–16 | 4-7 | Ryan Gymnasium; Washington, DC |
| Mon., Feb. 8, 1915 no, no | New York University | W 20–16 | 5-7 | Ryan Gymnasium; Washington, DC |
| Fri., Feb. 19, 1915 no, no | Penn State | L 27–35 | 5-8 | Ryan Gymnasium; Washington, DC |
| Wed., Feb. 24, 1915 no, no | George Washington | W 39–17 | 6-8 | Ryan Gymnasium; Washington, DC |
| Sat., Feb. 27, 1915 no, no | Gallaudet | W 29–18 | 7-8 | Ryan Gymnasium; Washington, DC |
| Sat., Mar. 6, 1915 no, no | George Washington | W 21–15 | 8-8 | Ryan Gymnasium; Washington, DC |
*Non-conference game. (#) Tournament seedings in parentheses.
