= 1914–15 Bucknell Bison men's basketball team =

American college basketball season

1914–15 Bucknell Bison men's basketball
- Conference: Independent
- Record: 5–11
- Head coach: George Cockill (1st season)
- Captain: Joe Gidaniec
- Home arena: none

1914–15 NCAA men's basketball independents standings
| | Conf. | | | | Overall |
| Team | W | | L | PCT | W | | L | PCT |
|---|---|---|---|---|---|---|---|---|
| Arizona | | – | | – | 9 | – | 0 | 1.000 |
| California | | – | | – | 6 | – | 0 | 1.000 |
| Kalamazoo | | – | | – | 7 | – | 0 | 1.000 |
| Virginia | | – | | – | 17 | – | 0 | 1.000 |
| St. Joseph's | | – | | – | 14 | – | 1 | .933 |
| Union (N.Y.) | | – | | – | 13 | – | 1 | .929 |
| Lake Forest | | – | | – | 12 | – | 1 | .923 |
| Allegheny | | – | | – | 11 | – | 1 | .917 |
| Louisiana State | | – | | – | 10 | – | 1 | .909 |
| Syracuse | | – | | – | 10 | – | 1 | .909 |
| Santa Clara | | – | | – | 9 | – | 1 | .900 |
| New Mexico | | – | | – | 8 | – | 1 | .889 |
| Seton Hall | | – | | – | 15 | – | 2 | .882 |
| Mount Union | | – | | – | 7 | – | 1 | .875 |
| Denison | | – | | – | 12 | – | 2 | .857 |
| Duquesne | | – | | – | 12 | – | 2 | .857 |
| Washington | | – | | – | 12 | – | 2 | .857 |
| Army | | – | | – | 11 | – | 2 | .846 |
| Carleton | | – | | – | 11 | – | 2 | .846 |
| Whittier | | – | | – | 16 | – | 3 | .842 |
| Franklin | | – | | – | 10 | – | 2 | .833 |
| North Dakota State | | – | | – | 10 | – | 2 | .833 |
| Notre Dame | | – | | – | 14 | – | 3 | .824 |
| Navy | | – | | – | 9 | – | 2 | .818 |
| Tennessee | | – | | – | 9 | – | 2 | .818 |
| VMI | | – | | – | 8 | – | 2 | .800 |
| Washington College | | – | | – | 11 | – | 3 | .786 |
| Pittsburgh | | – | | – | 14 | – | 4 | .778 |
| Wabash | | – | | – | 7 | – | 2 | .778 |
| Penn State | | – | | – | 10 | – | 3 | .769 |
| Central Missouri | | – | | – | 13 | – | 4 | .765 |
| Brigham Young | | – | | – | 6 | – | 2 | .750 |
| Nebraska Wesleyan | | – | | – | 12 | – | 4 | .750 |
| St. John's (NY) | | – | | – | 12 | – | 4 | .750 |
| Utah | | – | | – | 12 | – | 4 | .750 |
| Wake Forest | | – | | – | 12 | – | 4 | .750 |
| Washington State | | – | | – | 17 | – | 6 | .739 |
| Colgate | | – | | – | 11 | – | 4 | .733 |
| Millikin | | – | | – | 11 | – | 4 | .733 |
| Ohio | | – | | – | 11 | – | 4 | .733 |
| Bradley | | – | | – | 13 | – | 5 | .722 |
| The Citadel | | – | | – | 5 | – | 2 | .714 |
| Grinnell | | – | | – | 10 | – | 4 | .714 |
| Manhattan | | – | | – | 10 | – | 4 | .714 |
| Nevada | | – | | – | 5 | – | 2 | .714 |
| Oklahoma A&M | | – | | – | 10 | – | 4 | .714 |
| Roanoke | | – | | – | 10 | – | 4 | .714 |
| Muhlenberg | | – | | – | 12 | – | 5 | .706 |
| Temple | | – | | – | 9 | – | 4 | .692 |
| Virginia Tech | | – | | – | 9 | – | 4 | .692 |
| Grove City | | – | | – | 13 | – | 6 | .684 |
| Northern Colorado | | – | | – | 2 | – | 1 | .667 |
| Southwestern (Kan.) | | – | | – | 10 | – | 5 | .667 |
| Tulsa | | – | | – | 6 | – | 3 | .667 |
| Alabama | | – | | – | 7 | – | 4 | .636 |
| Augustana (Ill.) | | – | | – | 7 | – | 4 | .636 |
| North Dakota | | – | | – | 7 | – | 4 | .636 |
| Millsaps | | – | | – | 5 | – | 3 | .625 |
| Rochester (N.Y.) | | – | | – | 10 | – | 6 | .625 |
| Saint Mary's (Calif.) | | – | | – | 5 | – | 3 | .625 |
| Kent State | | – | | – | 3 | – | 2 | .600 |
| Kentucky | | – | | – | 7 | – | 5 | .583 |
| Oklahoma | | – | | – | 7 | – | 5 | .583 |
| Western State Normal | | – | | – | 7 | – | 5 | .583 |
| Georgia | | – | | – | 4 | – | 3 | .571 |
| Loyola (Md.) | | – | | – | 8 | – | 6 | .571 |
| Mississippi A&M | | – | | – | 8 | – | 6 | .571 |
| Lehigh | | – | | – | 9 | – | 7 | .563 |
| Indiana State | | – | | – | 7 | – | 6 | .538 |
| Fordham | | – | | – | 17 | – | 15 | .531 |
| Tempe Normal | | – | | – | 2 | – | 2 | .500 |
| Canisius | | – | | – | 5 | – | 5 | .500 |
| Davidson | | – | | – | 3 | – | 3 | .500 |
| Dayton | | – | | – | 4 | – | 4 | .500 |
| Georgetown | | – | | – | 8 | – | 8 | .500 |
| Trinity (N.C.) | | – | | – | 10 | – | 10 | .500 |
| Gettysburg | | – | | – | 9 | – | 9 | .500 |
| Marietta | | – | | – | 7 | – | 7 | .500 |
| New York University | | – | | – | 6 | – | 6 | .500 |
| North Carolina State | | – | | – | 5 | – | 5 | .500 |
| Oregon Agricultural | | – | | – | 10 | – | 10 | .500 |
| Vanderbilt | | – | | – | 6 | – | 6 | .500 |
| West Virginia | | – | | – | 10 | – | 10 | .500 |
| Wisconsin–Stevens Point | | – | | – | 5 | – | 5 | .500 |
| TCU | | – | | – | 11 | – | 12 | .478 |
| Niagara | | – | | – | 8 | – | 9 | .471 |
| Washburn | | – | | – | 5 | – | 6 | .455 |
| Louisville | | – | | – | 4 | – | 5 | .444 |
| Stanford | | – | | – | 4 | – | 5 | .444 |
| Michigan State | | – | | – | 7 | – | 9 | .438 |
| Butler | | – | | – | 3 | – | 4 | .429 |
| William & Mary | | – | | – | 5 | – | 8 | .385 |
| New Mexico A&M | | – | | – | 3 | – | 4 | .429 |
| Springfield (Mass.) | | – | | – | 6 | – | 8 | .429 |
| CCNY | | – | | – | 5 | – | 7 | .417 |
| Delaware | | – | | – | 5 | – | 7 | .417 |
| Oregon | | – | | – | 7 | – | 10 | .412 |
| Montana | | – | | – | 4 | – | 6 | .400 |
| Montana State | | – | | – | 4 | – | 6 | .400 |
| Tulane | | – | | – | 2 | – | 3 | .400 |
| Washington & Jefferson | | – | | – | 4 | – | 6 | .400 |
| Washington and Lee | | – | | – | 5 | – | 8 | .385 |
| William & Mary | | – | | – | 5 | – | 8 | .385 |
| Auburn | | – | | – | 3 | – | 5 | .375 |
| Detroit | | – | | – | 3 | – | 5 | .375 |
| North Carolina | | – | | – | 6 | – | 10 | .375 |
| Richmond | | – | | – | 3 | – | 5 | .375 |
| George Washington | | – | | – | 5 | – | 9 | .357 |
| Idaho | | – | | – | 5 | – | 9 | .357 |
| Southern California | | – | | – | 3 | – | 6 | .333 |
| Wooster | | – | | – | 5 | – | 10 | .333 |
| Wyoming | | – | | – | 2 | – | 4 | .333 |
| Bucknell | | – | | – | 5 | – | 11 | .313 |
| Miami (Ohio) | | – | | – | 4 | – | 9 | .308 |
| Clemson | | – | | – | 2 | – | 5 | .286 |
| Lafayette | | – | | – | 4 | – | 10 | .286 |
| Fairmount | | – | | – | 4 | – | 10 | .286 |
| Cincinnati | | – | | – | 3 | – | 8 | .273 |
| South Carolina | | – | | – | 2 | – | 7 | .222 |
| Connecticut | | – | | – | 1 | – | 4 | .200 |
| Akron | | – | | – | 2 | – | 10 | .167 |
| Utah State | | – | | – | 1 | – | 5 | .167 |
| Rutgers | | – | | – | 1 | – | 8 | .111 |
| Ole Miss | | – | | – | 0 | – | 3 | .000 |

The 1914–15 Bucknell Bison men's basketball team represented Bucknell University during the 1914–15 NCAA men's basketball season. The head coach was George Cockill, coaching the Bison in his first season. The Bison's team captain was Joe Gidaniec.

== Schedule ==
| Date time, TV | Opponent | Result | Record | Site city, state |
|---|---|---|---|---|
| 1/8/1915* | Bloomsburg | W 53–21 | 1–0 | Lewisburg, PA |
| 1/15/1915* | Muhlenberg | L 22–28 | 1–1 | Lewisburg, PA |
| 1/20/1915* | Susquehanna | W 39–28 | 2–1 | Lewisburg, PA |
| 1/26/1915* | Lafayette | W 33–32 ^{OT} | 3–1 | Lewisburg, PA |
| 1/29/1915* | Gettysburg | L 27–44 | 3–2 | Lewisburg, PA |
| 2/4/1915* | at Muhlenberg | L 31–44 | 3–3 | Allentown, PA |
| 2/5/1915* | at Lebanon Valley | W 30–28 | 4–3 | Annville, PA |
| 2/6/1915* | at Albright | L 24–38 | 4–4 | Reading, PA |
| 2/9/1915* | Juniata | W 38–24 | 5–4 | Lewisburg, PA |
| 2/13/1915* | at Susquehanna | L 31–47 | 5–5 | Sellinsgrove, PA |
| 2/15/1915* | H'burg YMCA | L 21–34 | 5–6 | Lewisburg, PA |
| 2/18/1915* | at Mt. St. Mary's | L 11–12 | 5–7 | Emmitsburg, MD |
| 2/19/1915* | at Gettysburg | L 29–54 | 5–8 | Gettysburg, PA |
| 2/20/1915* | at Lancaster | L 24–62 | 5–9 | Lancaster, PA |
| 2/26/1915* | Albright | L 36–38 ^{OT} | 5–10 | Lewisburg, PA |
| 3/3/1915* | at Syracuse | L 20–37 | 5–11 | Archbold Gymnasium; Syracuse, NY |
*Non-conference game. (#) Tournament seedings in parentheses.
