= 1914–15 Connecticut Aggies men's basketball team =

American college basketball season

1914–15 Connecticut Aggies men's basketball
- Conference: Athletic League of New England State Colleges
- Record: 1–4 (0–1 ALNESC)
- Home arena: Hawley Armory

1914–15 NCAA men's basketball independents standings
	Conf.				Overall
Team	W		L	PCT	W		L	PCT
Arizona		–		–	9	–	0	1.000
California		–		–	6	–	0	1.000
Kalamazoo		–		–	7	–	0	1.000
Virginia		–		–	17	–	0	1.000
St. Joseph's		–		–	14	–	1	.933
Union (N.Y.)		–		–	13	–	1	.929
Lake Forest		–		–	12	–	1	.923
Allegheny		–		–	11	–	1	.917
Louisiana State		–		–	10	–	1	.909
Syracuse		–		–	10	–	1	.909
Santa Clara		–		–	9	–	1	.900
New Mexico		–		–	8	–	1	.889
Seton Hall		–		–	15	–	2	.882
Mount Union		–		–	7	–	1	.875
Denison		–		–	12	–	2	.857
Duquesne		–		–	12	–	2	.857
Washington		–		–	12	–	2	.857
Army		–		–	11	–	2	.846
Carleton		–		–	11	–	2	.846
Whittier		–		–	16	–	3	.842
Franklin		–		–	10	–	2	.833
North Dakota State		–		–	10	–	2	.833
Notre Dame		–		–	14	–	3	.824
Navy		–		–	9	–	2	.818
Tennessee		–		–	9	–	2	.818
VMI		–		–	8	–	2	.800
Washington College		–		–	11	–	3	.786
Pittsburgh		–		–	14	–	4	.778
Wabash		–		–	7	–	2	.778
Penn State		–		–	10	–	3	.769
Central Missouri		–		–	13	–	4	.765
Brigham Young		–		–	6	–	2	.750
Nebraska Wesleyan		–		–	12	–	4	.750
St. John's (NY)		–		–	12	–	4	.750
Utah		–		–	12	–	4	.750
Wake Forest		–		–	12	–	4	.750
Washington State		–		–	17	–	6	.739
Colgate		–		–	11	–	4	.733
Millikin		–		–	11	–	4	.733
Ohio		–		–	11	–	4	.733
Bradley		–		–	13	–	5	.722
The Citadel		–		–	5	–	2	.714
Grinnell		–		–	10	–	4	.714
Manhattan		–		–	10	–	4	.714
Nevada		–		–	5	–	2	.714
Oklahoma A&M		–		–	10	–	4	.714
Roanoke		–		–	10	–	4	.714
Muhlenberg		–		–	12	–	5	.706
Temple		–		–	9	–	4	.692
Virginia Tech		–		–	9	–	4	.692
Grove City		–		–	13	–	6	.684
Northern Colorado		–		–	2	–	1	.667
Southwestern (Kan.)		–		–	10	–	5	.667
Tulsa		–		–	6	–	3	.667
Alabama		–		–	7	–	4	.636
Augustana (Ill.)		–		–	7	–	4	.636
North Dakota		–		–	7	–	4	.636
Millsaps		–		–	5	–	3	.625
Rochester (N.Y.)		–		–	10	–	6	.625
Saint Mary's (Calif.)		–		–	5	–	3	.625
Kent State		–		–	3	–	2	.600
Kentucky		–		–	7	–	5	.583
Oklahoma		–		–	7	–	5	.583
Western State Normal		–		–	7	–	5	.583
Georgia		–		–	4	–	3	.571
Loyola (Md.)		–		–	8	–	6	.571
Mississippi A&M		–		–	8	–	6	.571
Lehigh		–		–	9	–	7	.563
Indiana State		–		–	7	–	6	.538
Fordham		–		–	17	–	15	.531
Tempe Normal		–		–	2	–	2	.500
Canisius		–		–	5	–	5	.500
Davidson		–		–	3	–	3	.500
Dayton		–		–	4	–	4	.500
Georgetown		–		–	8	–	8	.500
Trinity (N.C.)		–		–	10	–	10	.500
Gettysburg		–		–	9	–	9	.500
Marietta		–		–	7	–	7	.500
New York University		–		–	6	–	6	.500
North Carolina State		–		–	5	–	5	.500
Oregon Agricultural		–		–	10	–	10	.500
Vanderbilt		–		–	6	–	6	.500
West Virginia		–		–	10	–	10	.500
Wisconsin–Stevens Point		–		–	5	–	5	.500
TCU		–		–	11	–	12	.478
Niagara		–		–	8	–	9	.471
Washburn		–		–	5	–	6	.455
Louisville		–		–	4	–	5	.444
Stanford		–		–	4	–	5	.444
Michigan State		–		–	7	–	9	.438
Butler		–		–	3	–	4	.429
William & Mary		–		–	5	–	8	.385
New Mexico A&M		–		–	3	–	4	.429
Springfield (Mass.)		–		–	6	–	8	.429
CCNY		–		–	5	–	7	.417
Delaware		–		–	5	–	7	.417
Oregon		–		–	7	–	10	.412
Montana		–		–	4	–	6	.400
Montana State		–		–	4	–	6	.400
Tulane		–		–	2	–	3	.400
Washington & Jefferson		–		–	4	–	6	.400
Washington and Lee		–		–	5	–	8	.385
William & Mary		–		–	5	–	8	.385
Auburn		–		–	3	–	5	.375
Detroit		–		–	3	–	5	.375
North Carolina		–		–	6	–	10	.375
Richmond		–		–	3	–	5	.375
George Washington		–		–	5	–	9	.357
Idaho		–		–	5	–	9	.357
Southern California		–		–	3	–	6	.333
Wooster		–		–	5	–	10	.333
Wyoming		–		–	2	–	4	.333
Bucknell		–		–	5	–	11	.313
Miami (Ohio)		–		–	4	–	9	.308
Clemson		–		–	2	–	5	.286
Lafayette		–		–	4	–	10	.286
Fairmount		–		–	4	–	10	.286
Cincinnati		–		–	3	–	8	.273
South Carolina		–		–	2	–	7	.222
Connecticut		–		–	1	–	4	.200
Akron		–		–	2	–	10	.167
Utah State		–		–	1	–	5	.167
Rutgers		–		–	1	–	8	.111
Ole Miss		–		–	0	–	3	.000

The 1914–15 Connecticut Aggies men's basketball team represented Connecticut Agricultural College, now the University of Connecticut, in the 1914–15 collegiate men's basketball season. The Aggies completed the season with a 1–4 overall record, after a year without competition from 1913–14. The Aggies were members of the Athletic League of New England State Colleges, where they ended the season with a 0–1 record. The Aggies played their home games at Hawley Armory in Storrs, Connecticut for the first time this season.

== Schedule ==
Date time, TV	Rank^{#}	Opponent^{#}	Result	Record	Site (attendance) city, state
Regular Season
		New Hampshire	L 15–27	0–1 (0–1)	
*		Dean	L 19–21	0–2	
*		Gamma Kappa Phi	L 21–23	0–3	
*		Bristol A.A.	W 25–21	1–3	
*		Yale 2nd	L 16–26	1–4	
*Non-conference game. ^{#}Rankings from AP Poll. (#) Tournament seedings in parentheses. All times are in Eastern Time.

Schedule Source:
