= 1914–15 Georgia Bulldogs basketball team =

American college basketball season

1914–15 Georgia Bulldogs basketball
- Conference: Southern Intercollegiate Athletic Association
- Record: 4–3 (2–2 SIAA)
- Head coach: Howell Peacock (3rd season)
- Captain: Louis Lester
- Home arena: Memorial Hall

1914–15 NCAA men's basketball independents standings
| | Conf. | | | | Overall |
| Team | W | | L | PCT | W | | L | PCT |
|---|---|---|---|---|---|---|---|---|
| Arizona | | – | | – | 9 | – | 0 | 1.000 |
| California | | – | | – | 6 | – | 0 | 1.000 |
| Kalamazoo | | – | | – | 7 | – | 0 | 1.000 |
| Virginia | | – | | – | 17 | – | 0 | 1.000 |
| St. Joseph's | | – | | – | 14 | – | 1 | .933 |
| Union (N.Y.) | | – | | – | 13 | – | 1 | .929 |
| Lake Forest | | – | | – | 12 | – | 1 | .923 |
| Allegheny | | – | | – | 11 | – | 1 | .917 |
| Louisiana State | | – | | – | 10 | – | 1 | .909 |
| Syracuse | | – | | – | 10 | – | 1 | .909 |
| Santa Clara | | – | | – | 9 | – | 1 | .900 |
| New Mexico | | – | | – | 8 | – | 1 | .889 |
| Seton Hall | | – | | – | 15 | – | 2 | .882 |
| Mount Union | | – | | – | 7 | – | 1 | .875 |
| Denison | | – | | – | 12 | – | 2 | .857 |
| Duquesne | | – | | – | 12 | – | 2 | .857 |
| Washington | | – | | – | 12 | – | 2 | .857 |
| Army | | – | | – | 11 | – | 2 | .846 |
| Carleton | | – | | – | 11 | – | 2 | .846 |
| Whittier | | – | | – | 16 | – | 3 | .842 |
| Franklin | | – | | – | 10 | – | 2 | .833 |
| North Dakota State | | – | | – | 10 | – | 2 | .833 |
| Notre Dame | | – | | – | 14 | – | 3 | .824 |
| Navy | | – | | – | 9 | – | 2 | .818 |
| Tennessee | | – | | – | 9 | – | 2 | .818 |
| VMI | | – | | – | 8 | – | 2 | .800 |
| Washington College | | – | | – | 11 | – | 3 | .786 |
| Pittsburgh | | – | | – | 14 | – | 4 | .778 |
| Wabash | | – | | – | 7 | – | 2 | .778 |
| Penn State | | – | | – | 10 | – | 3 | .769 |
| Central Missouri | | – | | – | 13 | – | 4 | .765 |
| Brigham Young | | – | | – | 6 | – | 2 | .750 |
| Nebraska Wesleyan | | – | | – | 12 | – | 4 | .750 |
| St. John's (NY) | | – | | – | 12 | – | 4 | .750 |
| Utah | | – | | – | 12 | – | 4 | .750 |
| Wake Forest | | – | | – | 12 | – | 4 | .750 |
| Washington State | | – | | – | 17 | – | 6 | .739 |
| Colgate | | – | | – | 11 | – | 4 | .733 |
| Millikin | | – | | – | 11 | – | 4 | .733 |
| Ohio | | – | | – | 11 | – | 4 | .733 |
| Bradley | | – | | – | 13 | – | 5 | .722 |
| The Citadel | | – | | – | 5 | – | 2 | .714 |
| Grinnell | | – | | – | 10 | – | 4 | .714 |
| Manhattan | | – | | – | 10 | – | 4 | .714 |
| Nevada | | – | | – | 5 | – | 2 | .714 |
| Oklahoma A&M | | – | | – | 10 | – | 4 | .714 |
| Roanoke | | – | | – | 10 | – | 4 | .714 |
| Muhlenberg | | – | | – | 12 | – | 5 | .706 |
| Temple | | – | | – | 9 | – | 4 | .692 |
| Virginia Tech | | – | | – | 9 | – | 4 | .692 |
| Grove City | | – | | – | 13 | – | 6 | .684 |
| Northern Colorado | | – | | – | 2 | – | 1 | .667 |
| Southwestern (Kan.) | | – | | – | 10 | – | 5 | .667 |
| Tulsa | | – | | – | 6 | – | 3 | .667 |
| Alabama | | – | | – | 7 | – | 4 | .636 |
| Augustana (Ill.) | | – | | – | 7 | – | 4 | .636 |
| North Dakota | | – | | – | 7 | – | 4 | .636 |
| Millsaps | | – | | – | 5 | – | 3 | .625 |
| Rochester (N.Y.) | | – | | – | 10 | – | 6 | .625 |
| Saint Mary's (Calif.) | | – | | – | 5 | – | 3 | .625 |
| Kent State | | – | | – | 3 | – | 2 | .600 |
| Kentucky | | – | | – | 7 | – | 5 | .583 |
| Oklahoma | | – | | – | 7 | – | 5 | .583 |
| Western State Normal | | – | | – | 7 | – | 5 | .583 |
| Georgia | | – | | – | 4 | – | 3 | .571 |
| Loyola (Md.) | | – | | – | 8 | – | 6 | .571 |
| Mississippi A&M | | – | | – | 8 | – | 6 | .571 |
| Lehigh | | – | | – | 9 | – | 7 | .563 |
| Indiana State | | – | | – | 7 | – | 6 | .538 |
| Fordham | | – | | – | 17 | – | 15 | .531 |
| Tempe Normal | | – | | – | 2 | – | 2 | .500 |
| Canisius | | – | | – | 5 | – | 5 | .500 |
| Davidson | | – | | – | 3 | – | 3 | .500 |
| Dayton | | – | | – | 4 | – | 4 | .500 |
| Georgetown | | – | | – | 8 | – | 8 | .500 |
| Trinity (N.C.) | | – | | – | 10 | – | 10 | .500 |
| Gettysburg | | – | | – | 9 | – | 9 | .500 |
| Marietta | | – | | – | 7 | – | 7 | .500 |
| New York University | | – | | – | 6 | – | 6 | .500 |
| North Carolina State | | – | | – | 5 | – | 5 | .500 |
| Oregon Agricultural | | – | | – | 10 | – | 10 | .500 |
| Vanderbilt | | – | | – | 6 | – | 6 | .500 |
| West Virginia | | – | | – | 10 | – | 10 | .500 |
| Wisconsin–Stevens Point | | – | | – | 5 | – | 5 | .500 |
| TCU | | – | | – | 11 | – | 12 | .478 |
| Niagara | | – | | – | 8 | – | 9 | .471 |
| Washburn | | – | | – | 5 | – | 6 | .455 |
| Louisville | | – | | – | 4 | – | 5 | .444 |
| Stanford | | – | | – | 4 | – | 5 | .444 |
| Michigan State | | – | | – | 7 | – | 9 | .438 |
| Butler | | – | | – | 3 | – | 4 | .429 |
| William & Mary | | – | | – | 5 | – | 8 | .385 |
| New Mexico A&M | | – | | – | 3 | – | 4 | .429 |
| Springfield (Mass.) | | – | | – | 6 | – | 8 | .429 |
| CCNY | | – | | – | 5 | – | 7 | .417 |
| Delaware | | – | | – | 5 | – | 7 | .417 |
| Oregon | | – | | – | 7 | – | 10 | .412 |
| Montana | | – | | – | 4 | – | 6 | .400 |
| Montana State | | – | | – | 4 | – | 6 | .400 |
| Tulane | | – | | – | 2 | – | 3 | .400 |
| Washington & Jefferson | | – | | – | 4 | – | 6 | .400 |
| Washington and Lee | | – | | – | 5 | – | 8 | .385 |
| William & Mary | | – | | – | 5 | – | 8 | .385 |
| Auburn | | – | | – | 3 | – | 5 | .375 |
| Detroit | | – | | – | 3 | – | 5 | .375 |
| North Carolina | | – | | – | 6 | – | 10 | .375 |
| Richmond | | – | | – | 3 | – | 5 | .375 |
| George Washington | | – | | – | 5 | – | 9 | .357 |
| Idaho | | – | | – | 5 | – | 9 | .357 |
| Southern California | | – | | – | 3 | – | 6 | .333 |
| Wooster | | – | | – | 5 | – | 10 | .333 |
| Wyoming | | – | | – | 2 | – | 4 | .333 |
| Bucknell | | – | | – | 5 | – | 11 | .313 |
| Miami (Ohio) | | – | | – | 4 | – | 9 | .308 |
| Clemson | | – | | – | 2 | – | 5 | .286 |
| Lafayette | | – | | – | 4 | – | 10 | .286 |
| Fairmount | | – | | – | 4 | – | 10 | .286 |
| Cincinnati | | – | | – | 3 | – | 8 | .273 |
| South Carolina | | – | | – | 2 | – | 7 | .222 |
| Connecticut | | – | | – | 1 | – | 4 | .200 |
| Akron | | – | | – | 2 | – | 10 | .167 |
| Utah State | | – | | – | 1 | – | 5 | .167 |
| Rutgers | | – | | – | 1 | – | 8 | .111 |
| Ole Miss | | – | | – | 0 | – | 3 | .000 |

The 1914–15 Georgia Bulldogs basketball team represented the University of Georgia as a member of the Southern Intercollegiate Athletic Association (SIAA) during the 1914–15 NCAA men's basketball season. Led by third-year head coach Howell Peacock, the Bulldogs compiled an overall record of 4–3 with a mark of 2–2 in conference play. The team captain was Louis Lester.

== Schedule ==
| Date time, TV | Opponent | Result | Record | Site city, state |
|---|---|---|---|---|
| * | Mercer | W 36–19 | 1–0 | Memorial Hall; Athens, GA |
| * | Columbus YMCA | L 23–39 | 1–1 | Memorial Hall; Athens, GA |
| * | Mercer | L 25–26 | 1–2 | Memorial Hall; Athens, GA |
| * | Chattanooga | L 17–43 | 1–3 | Memorial Hall; Athens, GA |
| February 5* | at Vanderbilt | W 25–23 | 2–3 | Nashville YMCA; Nashville, TN |
| * | at Nashville Ramblers | W 52–27 | 3–3 | |
| * | Columbus YMCA | W 34–28 | 4–3 | Memorial Hall; Athens, GA |
*Non-conference game. (#) Tournament seedings in parentheses.
