= 1914–15 Cincinnati Bearcats men's basketball team =

American college basketball season

1914–15 Cincinnati Bearcats men's basketball
- Conference: Ohio Athletic Conference
- Record: 3–8 (3–7 OAC)
- Head coach: George Little (1st season)
- Captain: Prosper Russo
- Home arena: Schmidlapp Gymnasium

The 1914–15 Cincinnati Bearcats men's basketball team represented the University of Cincinnati during the 1914–15 college men's basketball season. The head coach was George Little, coaching his first season with the Bearcats.

== Schedule ==
Date time, TV	Opponent	Result	Record	Site city, state
January 15	Wittenberg	L 19–31	0–1	Schmidlapp Gymnasium; Cincinnati, OH
January 22	at Kenyon	L 26–32	0–2	Gambier, OH
January 23	at Wittenberg	L 8–25	0–3	Springfield, OH
January 28	at Miami (OH)	L 13–28	0–4	Oxford, OH
February 5	Denison	L 13–48	0–5	Schmidlapp Gymnasium; Cincinnati, OH
February 12	at Capital	L 17–42	0–6	
February 19	Ohio	L 13–50	0–7	Schmidlapp Gymnasium; Cincinnati, OH
February 20	Akron	W 34–16	1–7	Schmidlapp Gymnasium; Cincinnati, OH
February 26	Kenyon	W 25–21	2–7	Schmidlapp Gymnasium; Cincinnati, OH
March 5	at Ohio	L 10–32	2–8	Athens, OH
March 12	Miami (OH)	W 34–21	3–8	Schmidlapp Gymnasium; Cincinnati, OH
*Non-conference game. (#) Tournament seedings in parentheses.
