= Carleton Knights =

Athletic teams representing Carleton College

- University: Carleton College
- Nickname: Knights
- NCAA: Division III
- Conference: MIAC
- Athletic director: Gerald Young
- Location: Northfield, Minnesota
- Varsity teams: 20
- Football stadium: Laird Stadium
- Basketball arena: West Gymnasium
- Colors: Blue and maize
- Website: athletics.carleton.edu

The Carleton Knights are the athletic teams that represent Carleton College, located in Northfield, Minnesota, in intercollegiate sports as a member of the NCAA Division III ranks, primarily competing in the Minnesota Intercollegiate Athletic Conference (MIAC) since the 1983–84 academic year; which they were a member on a previous stint from 1920–21 to 1924–25. The Knights previously competed in the Midwest Conference (MWC) from 1925–26 to 1982–83; although Carleton had dual conference membership with the MWC and the MIAC between 1921–22 and 1924–25.

All students must participate in physical education or athletic activities to fulfill graduation requirements.

== Rivalries ==
Carleton's biggest athletic rival is St. Olaf College, located across the Cannon River on the other side of Northfield. The Knights and the Oles contest six trophies in yearly matchups. The first trophy, The Goat, was created in 1913 and goes to the winning men's basketball team.

== Varsity teams ==
Carleton competes in 18 intercollegiate varsity sports (9 for men and 9 for women): Men's sports include baseball, basketball, cross country, football, golf, soccer, swimming, tennis and track & field; while women's sports include basketball, cross country, golf, soccer, softball, swimming, tennis, track & field and volleyball.

Men's sports	Women's sports
Baseball	Basketball
Basketball	Cross country
Cross country	Golf
Football	Soccer
Golf	Softball
Soccer	Swimming and diving
Swimming and diving	Tennis
Tennis	Track & field^{†}
Track & field^{†}	Volleyball
† – Track and field includes both indoor and outdoor.

=== Basketball ===
Freddie Gillespie, who later played in the NBA and in the Israeli Basketball Premier League, as a sophomore in 2016-17 was named second-team All-Minnesota Intercollegiate Athletic Conference, as well as to the MIAC All-Defensive Team.

=== Cross country and track ===
The men's cross country program started with a dual meet against St. Olaf in 1913.

Dale Kramer won four NCAA D-III individual championships in two years. He was the cross country champion in 1976 and 1977, as well as the 5,000 meters outdoor track champion in 1977 and 1978.

Carleton's men’s cross country team won the 1980 NCAA Division III Championship. The team has participated in the Championship 21 times. The Knights men's runners have won 23 Midwest Conference championships from 1932 to 1982 and 6 MIAC championships, in 1994, 1995, 2002, 2017, 2018, and 2019.

The men's track team has scored points at the NCAA Championships 8 times at the national indoor meet and 25 times at the national outdoor meet.

Anna Prineas won four NCAA D-III women’s titles over 15 months: 3,000 meters indoor track and cross country in 1988, plus the 5,000 and 10,000 meters outdoor track in 1989.

The Carleton's women's cross country team won the 2023 NCAA Division III Championship, led by Hannah Preisser (14th place) and Phoebe Ward (16th place). The team beat out the number 1-ranked NYU. The team has also participated in the NCAA Division III Championship 18 times since 1985. They have won 11 MIAC championships, in 1991, 2004, 2005, 2009, 2011, 2013, 2014, 2015, 2017, 2018, and 2019.

Both the men's and women's cross country teams compete against St. Olaf College runners in the Great Karhu Shoe Race each year. Starting in 1972, runners who aren't appearing at the following weekend's NCAA Central Region Championships race against each other for the trophy, a pair of Karhu shoes.

Laird Stadium has hosted the NCAA D-III Outdoor Championship track meet in 1984, 1988, and 1995.

=== Football ===
Carleton played its first game against the University of Minnesota in 1883. Carleton won the rugby style football game 4–2.

The Knights have won two MIAC football conference championships, in 1924 and 1992. With a 9–1 overall record, the 1992 team was selected to play in the NCAA Division III Football Tournament, losing in the first round to Central College (Iowa) 20–8. Carleton competed in the Midwest Conference from 1922 to 1982 and won 9 conference football championships during that time.

Carleton and St. Olaf played their first football game in 1918 and have played each other every year except four since then. The winner of the game gets the Goat Trophy, which was first awarded in 1931. Sports Illustrated wrote about the undefeated 1954 team's game vs. St. Olaf and covered the 1962 St. Olaf at Carleton game.

=== Golf ===
18-year-old Carole Pushing won the women's individual intercollegiate golf championship in 1958, an event conducted by the Division of Girls' and Women's Sports, which later evolved into the current NCAA women's golf championship.

The women's golf program started in 1998–1999. The Knights won MIAC championships in 2014 and 2017.

The women's golf program has been ranked #1 in the nation from October 2018 to May 2019 and remained undefeated from April 2017 to May 2019. The team repeated as MIAC champs in 2018, winning by 66 strokes and smashing its own conference tournament 54-hole record by 20 strokes. Carleton made even more history in October 2018 by becoming the first squad to have its 5 player lineup place 1–5 on the individual leaderboard—an unprecedented feat and first-time occurrence in the history of NCAA women's golf. To continue their record-breaking performance, 6 of their 9 players received All-Conference honors. They also swept the end-of-season MIAC awards, taking home honors for Player of the Year, Senior of the Year, Rookie of the Year, and Coach of the Year for the 2018–19 season.

The men's golf program started with a dual meet against the University of Minnesota in 1933.

Wally Ulrich won the NCAA individual national championship in men's golf in 1943 and the Midwest Conference title in 1947. Carleton men won 5 out of the first 6 MWC team championships, from 1934 to 1939, and 6 more from 1950 to 1974.

=== Tennis ===
At the 2021 NCAA Division III men's tennis championships, Leo Vithoontien won the singles title, while Vithoontien and teammate Xander Zuczek won the doubles title.

== Club sports ==
Carleton offers 25 student-run club sports teams.

Ultimate clubs have had the most national success; the school's top men's team, Carleton Ultimate Team (CUT), and women's team, Syzygy, are perennial national contenders in the USA Ultimate College Division I tournaments. CUT has qualified for nationals all but two years since 1989, and won the National Championship in 2001, 2009, 2011, 2017, and 2025. Syzygy has qualified for women's nationals all but two years since 1987, and won the National Championship in 2000. The other men's Ultimate team, the Gods of Plastic, won the 2010 and 2012 College Division III Open National Championships, and the other women's Ultimate team, Eclipse, won the College Division III Women's nationals in 2011, 2016, and 2017.

The women's rugby team was founded in 1978. Each year the team plays a fall season in the National Small College Rugby Organization. The women's ruggers won the Division 3 National Championship in 2011.

== Rotblatt ==
In 1964, Carleton students named an intramural slow-pitch softball league after Marv Rotblatt, a former Chicago White Sox pitcher. Although traditional intramural softball is still played at Carleton, the name "Rotblatt" now refers to an annual beer softball game that is played with one inning for every year of the school's over 150-year existence. In 1997, Sports Illustrated honored Rotblatt in its "Best of Everything" section with the award, "Longest Intramural Event."

== Facilities ==
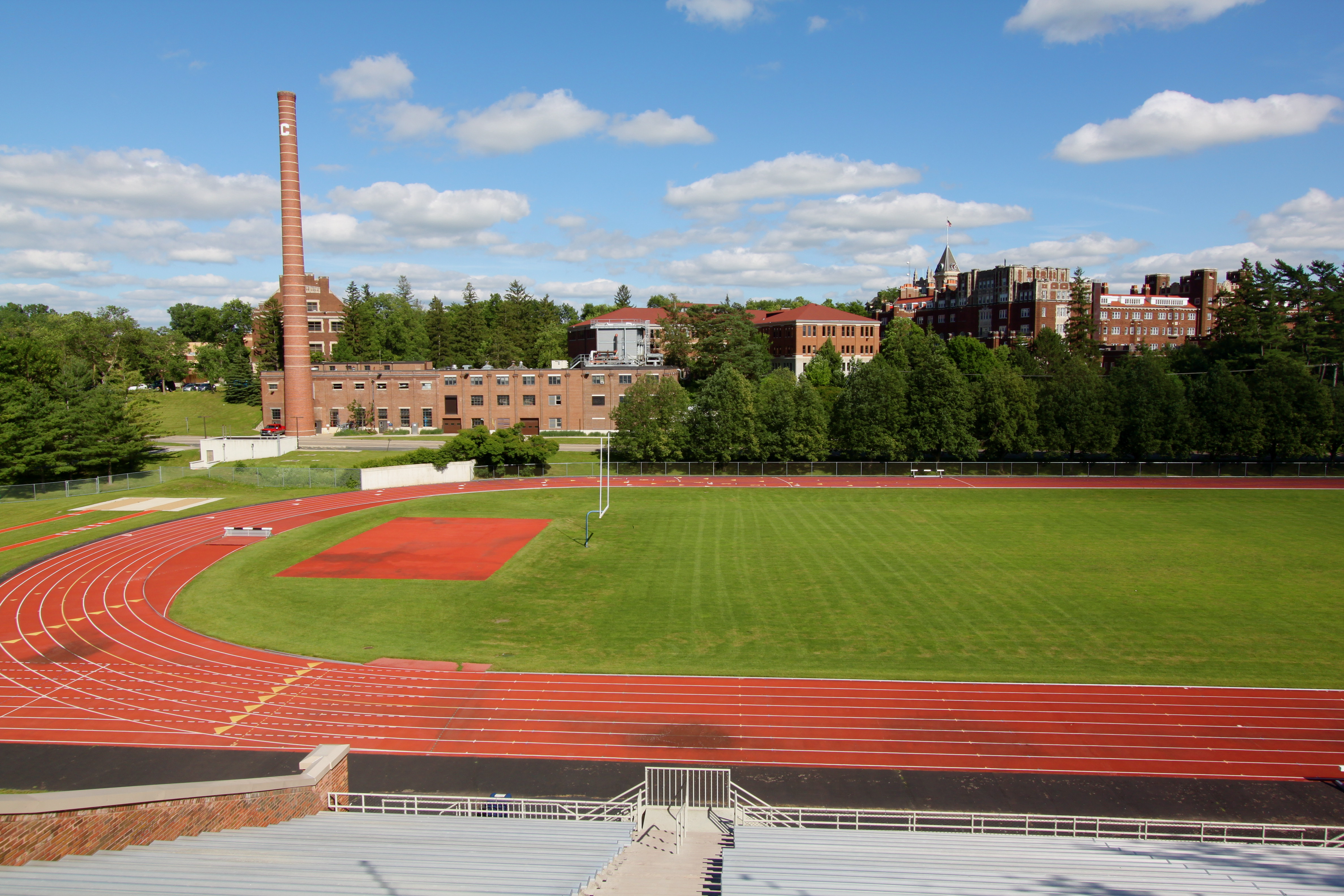
Laird Stadium, football and athletics venue

- Laird Stadium is the home of the Carleton Knights football and track and field teams. At 7,500 seats, it is one of the largest in Division III. Laird has been the site for the NCAA Division III Outdoor Track and Field Championships three times.
- West Gymnasium is the home for Knights basketball and volleyball teams. It seats 1,240.
- Thorpe Pool is a six-lane, 25-yard pool with one- and three-meter diving boards and seating for 350.
- Bell Field Soccer is home of the soccer teams, as well as a variety of intramural and club sports.
- Bell Field Tennis hosted the 1994 NCAA Division III Tennis Championships.
- Ele Hansen Field has been the home of the softball team since 2010.
- Willingers Golf Club is the home course for the Knights' men's and women's golf teams.
- Mel Taube Field has been the home of the Carleton baseball team since 2004. The field is named after Mel Taube, the Carleton Baseball coach from 1951–1970.
