= 1914–15 Ohio Bobcats men's basketball team =

American college basketball season

1914–15 Ohio Bobcats men's basketball
- Conference: Ohio Athletic Conference
- Record: 11–4 (8–3 OAC)
- Head coach: M. B. Banks (2nd season)
- Home arena: Ohio Gymnasium

The 1914–15 Ohio Bobcats men's basketball team represented Ohio University. M. B. Banks was the head coach for Ohio. The Bobcats played their home games in Ohio Gymnasium.

== Schedule ==
Date time, TV	Rank^{#}	Opponent^{#}	Result	Record	Site (attendance) city, state
Regular Season
*		Ohio Northern	W 35–26	1–0	Ohio Gymnasium; Athens, OH
		at Denison	L 27–40	1–1	Granville, OH
*		Baldwin Wallace	W 36–26	2–1	Ohio Gymnasium; Athens, OH
		at Wittenberg	W 30–26	3–1	Springfield, OH
		at Kenyon	W 35–27	4–1	Gambier, OH
*		at Baldwin Wallace	L 23–30	4–2	Berea, OH
		at Wooster	L 22–25	4–3	Wooster, OH
		Miami (OH)	W 42–15	5–3	Ohio Gymnasium; Athens, OH
		Cincinnati	W 50–13	6–3	Ohio Gymnasium; Athens, OH
		Oberlin	L 25–39	6–4	Ohio Gymnasium; Athens, OH
		Kenyon	T 29–29	7–4	Ohio Gymnasium; Athens, OH
		Wooster	W 51–20	8–4	Ohio Gymnasium; Athens, OH
*		Otterbein	W 46–29	9–4	Ohio Gymnasium; Athens, OH
		at Cincinnati	W 32–10	10–4	Schmidlapp Gym; Cincinnati, OH
		at Miami (OH)	W 28–27	11–4	Oxford, OH
*Non-conference game. ^{#}Rankings from AP Poll. (#) Tournament seedings in parentheses. All times are in Eastern Time.
