= 1915–16 Connecticut Aggies men's basketball team =

American college basketball season

1915–16 Connecticut Aggies men's basketball
- Conference: Athletic League of New England State Colleges
- Record: 5–3 (2–1 ALNESC)
- Head coach: John F. Donahue (1st season)
- Home arena: Hawley Armory

1915–16 NCAA men's basketball independents standings
	Conf.				Overall
Team	W		L	PCT	W		L	PCT
Arizona		–		–	5	–	0	1.000
Carleton		–		–	15	–	0	1.000
North Dakota Agricultural		–		–	18	–	0	1.000
Roanoke		–		–	9	–	0	1.000
Tennessee		–		–	12	–	0	1.000
Utah		–		–	11	–	0	1.000
Allegheny		–		–	10	–	1	.909
Montana State		–		–	10	–	1	.909
Nebraska Wesleyan		–		–	20	–	2	.909
Wake Forest		–		–	16	–	2	.889
Pittsburgh		–		–	15	–	2	.882
Seton Hall		–		–	13	–	2	.867
Navy		–		–	12	–	2	.857
Augustana (Ill.)		–		–	11	–	2	.846
Dayton		–		–	11	–	2	.846
Virginia		–		–	11	–	2	.846
Ripon		–		–	15	–	3	.833
Swarthmore		–		–	10	–	2	.833
New Mexico		–		–	9	–	2	.818
Wabash		–		–	17	–	4	.810
Virginia Tech		–		–	12	–	3	.800
Vanderbilt		–		–	11	–	3	.786
Colgate		–		–	14	–	4	.778
Duquesne		–		–	7	–	2	.778
Georgia		–		–	7	–	2	.778
Bucknell		–		–	10	–	3	.769
Saint Mary's (Calif.)		–		–	10	–	3	.769
Alabama		–		–	13	–	4	.765
Millikin		–		–	16	–	5	.762
Notre Dame		–		–	9	–	3	.750
Syracuse		–		–	9	–	3	.750
VMI		–		–	9	–	3	.750
New York University		–		–	11	–	4	.733
Oklahoma		–		–	19	–	7	.731
Louisville		–		–	8	–	3	.727
Penn State		–		–	8	–	3	.727
Fordham		–		–	10	–	4	.714
North Central		–		–	12	–	5	.706
Detroit		–		–	7	–	3	.700
Catholic		–		–	9	–	4	.692
Central Missouri		–		–	9	–	4	.692
Lake Forest		–		–	9	–	4	.692
Gettysburg		–		–	11	–	5	.688
Mississippi A&M		–		–	11	–	5	.688
Santa Clara		–		–	11	–	5	.688
Saint Louis		–		–	13	–	6	.684
Kalamazoo		–		–	6	–	3	.667
New Mexico A&M		–		–	6	–	3	.667
The Citadel		–		–	4	–	2	.667
North Carolina		–		–	12	–	6	.667
Toledo		–		–	2	–	1	.667
Fairmount		–		–	10	–	5	.667
Buffalo		–		–	7	–	4	.636
Delaware		–		–	7	–	4	.636
Washington College		–		–	7	–	4	.636
William & Mary		–		–	7	–	4	.636
Connecticut		–		–	5	–	3	.625
West Virginia		–		–	11	–	7	.611
Denison		–		–	9	–	6	.600
Georgetown		–		–	9	–	6	.600
Millsaps		–		–	6	–	4	.600
Montana		–		–	6	–	4	.600
Mount Union		–		–	6	–	4	.600
Union (N.Y.)		–		–	9	–	6	.600
Wyoming		–		–	3	–	2	.600
Louisiana State		–		–	14	–	10	.583
Davidson		–		–	11	–	8	.579
Indiana State		–		–	7	–	2	.778
Kentucky		–		–	8	–	6	.571
Southwestern (Kan.)		–		–	8	–	6	.571
Grove City		–		–	9	–	7	.563
Tulsa		–		–	9	–	7	.563
Western State Normal		–		–	9	–	7	.563
Tulane		–		–	10	–	8	.556
St. Joseph's		–		–	11	–	9	.550
North Dakota		–		–	6	–	5	.545
Wisconsin–Stevens Point		–		–	6	–	5	.545
CCNY		–		–	7	–	6	.538
Temple		–		–	7	–	6	.538
Ohio		–		–	8	–	7	.533
Wooster		–		–	8	–	7	.533
Lehigh		–		–	12	–	11	.522
Akron		–		–	5	–	5	.500
Boston University		–		–	2	–	2	.500
Brigham Young		–		–	3	–	3	.500
Michigan State		–		–	8	–	8	.500
Oklahoma A&M		–		–	7	–	8	.467
Muhlenberg		–		–	5	–	6	.455
Trinity (N.C.)		–		–	9	–	11	.450
Bradley		–		–	8	–	10	.444
Lafayette		–		–	7	–	9	.438
Butler		–		–	3	–	4	.429
Rutgers		–		–	3	–	4	.429
Washington and Lee		–		–	6	–	8	.429
Army		–		–	5	–	7	.417
Niagara		–		–	4	–	6	.400
Rochester (N.Y.)		–		–	6	–	9	.400
South Carolina		–		–	4	–	6	.400
Rhode Island State		–		–	3	–	5	.375
Ole Miss		–		–	4	–	7	.364
Kent State		–		–	4	–	8	.333
St. John's (NY)		–		–	5	–	10	.333
Utah State		–		–	2	–	4	.333
Washburn		–		–	4	–	8	.333
Virginia Tech		–		–	12	–	3	.800
Manhattan		–		–	4	–	9	.308
Miami (Ohio)		–		–	4	–	9	.308
Richmond		–		–	4	–	9	.308
North Carolina State		–		–	2	–	5	.286
Bowling Green State		–		–	3	–	8	.273
Auburn		–		–	2	–	6	.250
Clemson		–		–	2	–	6	.250
Southern California		–		–	5	–	15	.250
Texas Christian		–		–	1	–	3	.250
DePauw		–		–	1	–	3	.250
Northern Colorado		–		–	1	–	4	.200
Washington & Jefferson		–		–	1	–	4	.200
Stanford		–		–	2	–	9	.182
George Washington		–		–	2	–	10	.167
Cincinnati		–		–	1	–	9	.100
Idaho		–		–	1	–	12	.077
Canisius		–		–	0	–	4	.000

The 1915–16 Connecticut Aggies men's basketball team represented Connecticut Agricultural College, now the University of Connecticut, in the 1915–16 collegiate men's basketball season. The Aggies completed the season with a 5–3 overall record. The Aggies were members of the Athletic League of New England State Colleges, where they ended the season with a 2–1 record. The Aggies played their home games at Hawley Armory in Storrs, Connecticut, and were led by first-year head coach John F. Donahue.

== Schedule ==
Date time, TV	Rank^{#}	Opponent^{#}	Result	Record	Site (attendance) city, state
Regular Season
*		Willimantic Emids	W 32–11	1–0	
*		Wesleyan	L 23–42	1–1	
*		Springfield College	L 18–44	1–2	
*		Trinity Rovers	W 32–14	2–2	
		New Hampshire	L 23–25	2–3 (0–1)	
*		Bristol A.A.	W 76–20	3–3	
		Rhode Island	W 39–10	4–3 (1–1)	
		Rhode Island	W 26–18	5–3 (2–1)	
*Non-conference game. ^{#}Rankings from AP Poll. (#) Tournament seedings in parentheses. All times are in Eastern Time.

Schedule Source:
