= 1915–16 Colgate men's basketball team =

American college basketball season

1915–16 Colgate Raiders men's basketball
- Conference: Independent
- Record: 14–4
- Head coach: Walt Hammond (3rd season)
- Captain: Don Kennedy
- Home arena: none

1915–16 NCAA men's basketball independents standings
| | Conf. | | | | Overall |
| Team | W | | L | PCT | W | | L | PCT |
|---|---|---|---|---|---|---|---|---|
| Arizona | | – | | – | 5 | – | 0 | 1.000 |
| Carleton | | – | | – | 15 | – | 0 | 1.000 |
| North Dakota Agricultural | | – | | – | 18 | – | 0 | 1.000 |
| Roanoke | | – | | – | 9 | – | 0 | 1.000 |
| Tennessee | | – | | – | 12 | – | 0 | 1.000 |
| Utah | | – | | – | 11 | – | 0 | 1.000 |
| Allegheny | | – | | – | 10 | – | 1 | .909 |
| Montana State | | – | | – | 10 | – | 1 | .909 |
| Nebraska Wesleyan | | – | | – | 20 | – | 2 | .909 |
| Wake Forest | | – | | – | 16 | – | 2 | .889 |
| Pittsburgh | | – | | – | 15 | – | 2 | .882 |
| Seton Hall | | – | | – | 13 | – | 2 | .867 |
| Navy | | – | | – | 12 | – | 2 | .857 |
| Augustana (Ill.) | | – | | – | 11 | – | 2 | .846 |
| Dayton | | – | | – | 11 | – | 2 | .846 |
| Virginia | | – | | – | 11 | – | 2 | .846 |
| Ripon | | – | | – | 15 | – | 3 | .833 |
| Swarthmore | | – | | – | 10 | – | 2 | .833 |
| New Mexico | | – | | – | 9 | – | 2 | .818 |
| Wabash | | – | | – | 17 | – | 4 | .810 |
| Virginia Tech | | – | | – | 12 | – | 3 | .800 |
| Vanderbilt | | – | | – | 11 | – | 3 | .786 |
| Colgate | | – | | – | 14 | – | 4 | .778 |
| Duquesne | | – | | – | 7 | – | 2 | .778 |
| Georgia | | – | | – | 7 | – | 2 | .778 |
| Bucknell | | – | | – | 10 | – | 3 | .769 |
| Saint Mary's (Calif.) | | – | | – | 10 | – | 3 | .769 |
| Alabama | | – | | – | 13 | – | 4 | .765 |
| Millikin | | – | | – | 16 | – | 5 | .762 |
| Notre Dame | | – | | – | 9 | – | 3 | .750 |
| Syracuse | | – | | – | 9 | – | 3 | .750 |
| VMI | | – | | – | 9 | – | 3 | .750 |
| New York University | | – | | – | 11 | – | 4 | .733 |
| Oklahoma | | – | | – | 19 | – | 7 | .731 |
| Louisville | | – | | – | 8 | – | 3 | .727 |
| Penn State | | – | | – | 8 | – | 3 | .727 |
| Fordham | | – | | – | 10 | – | 4 | .714 |
| North Central | | – | | – | 12 | – | 5 | .706 |
| Detroit | | – | | – | 7 | – | 3 | .700 |
| Catholic | | – | | – | 9 | – | 4 | .692 |
| Central Missouri | | – | | – | 9 | – | 4 | .692 |
| Lake Forest | | – | | – | 9 | – | 4 | .692 |
| Gettysburg | | – | | – | 11 | – | 5 | .688 |
| Mississippi A&M | | – | | – | 11 | – | 5 | .688 |
| Santa Clara | | – | | – | 11 | – | 5 | .688 |
| Saint Louis | | – | | – | 13 | – | 6 | .684 |
| Kalamazoo | | – | | – | 6 | – | 3 | .667 |
| New Mexico A&M | | – | | – | 6 | – | 3 | .667 |
| The Citadel | | – | | – | 4 | – | 2 | .667 |
| North Carolina | | – | | – | 12 | – | 6 | .667 |
| Toledo | | – | | – | 2 | – | 1 | .667 |
| Fairmount | | – | | – | 10 | – | 5 | .667 |
| Buffalo | | – | | – | 7 | – | 4 | .636 |
| Delaware | | – | | – | 7 | – | 4 | .636 |
| Washington College | | – | | – | 7 | – | 4 | .636 |
| William & Mary | | – | | – | 7 | – | 4 | .636 |
| Connecticut | | – | | – | 5 | – | 3 | .625 |
| West Virginia | | – | | – | 11 | – | 7 | .611 |
| Denison | | – | | – | 9 | – | 6 | .600 |
| Georgetown | | – | | – | 9 | – | 6 | .600 |
| Millsaps | | – | | – | 6 | – | 4 | .600 |
| Montana | | – | | – | 6 | – | 4 | .600 |
| Mount Union | | – | | – | 6 | – | 4 | .600 |
| Union (N.Y.) | | – | | – | 9 | – | 6 | .600 |
| Wyoming | | – | | – | 3 | – | 2 | .600 |
| Louisiana State | | – | | – | 14 | – | 10 | .583 |
| Davidson | | – | | – | 11 | – | 8 | .579 |
| Indiana State | | – | | – | 7 | – | 2 | .778 |
| Kentucky | | – | | – | 8 | – | 6 | .571 |
| Southwestern (Kan.) | | – | | – | 8 | – | 6 | .571 |
| Grove City | | – | | – | 9 | – | 7 | .563 |
| Tulsa | | – | | – | 9 | – | 7 | .563 |
| Western State Normal | | – | | – | 9 | – | 7 | .563 |
| Tulane | | – | | – | 10 | – | 8 | .556 |
| St. Joseph's | | – | | – | 11 | – | 9 | .550 |
| North Dakota | | – | | – | 6 | – | 5 | .545 |
| Wisconsin–Stevens Point | | – | | – | 6 | – | 5 | .545 |
| CCNY | | – | | – | 7 | – | 6 | .538 |
| Temple | | – | | – | 7 | – | 6 | .538 |
| Ohio | | – | | – | 8 | – | 7 | .533 |
| Wooster | | – | | – | 8 | – | 7 | .533 |
| Lehigh | | – | | – | 12 | – | 11 | .522 |
| Akron | | – | | – | 5 | – | 5 | .500 |
| Boston University | | – | | – | 2 | – | 2 | .500 |
| Brigham Young | | – | | – | 3 | – | 3 | .500 |
| Michigan State | | – | | – | 8 | – | 8 | .500 |
| Oklahoma A&M | | – | | – | 7 | – | 8 | .467 |
| Muhlenberg | | – | | – | 5 | – | 6 | .455 |
| Trinity (N.C.) | | – | | – | 9 | – | 11 | .450 |
| Bradley | | – | | – | 8 | – | 10 | .444 |
| Lafayette | | – | | – | 7 | – | 9 | .438 |
| Butler | | – | | – | 3 | – | 4 | .429 |
| Rutgers | | – | | – | 3 | – | 4 | .429 |
| Washington and Lee | | – | | – | 6 | – | 8 | .429 |
| Army | | – | | – | 5 | – | 7 | .417 |
| Niagara | | – | | – | 4 | – | 6 | .400 |
| Rochester (N.Y.) | | – | | – | 6 | – | 9 | .400 |
| South Carolina | | – | | – | 4 | – | 6 | .400 |
| Rhode Island State | | – | | – | 3 | – | 5 | .375 |
| Ole Miss | | – | | – | 4 | – | 7 | .364 |
| Kent State | | – | | – | 4 | – | 8 | .333 |
| St. John's (NY) | | – | | – | 5 | – | 10 | .333 |
| Utah State | | – | | – | 2 | – | 4 | .333 |
| Washburn | | – | | – | 4 | – | 8 | .333 |
| Virginia Tech | | – | | – | 12 | – | 3 | .800 |
| Manhattan | | – | | – | 4 | – | 9 | .308 |
| Miami (Ohio) | | – | | – | 4 | – | 9 | .308 |
| Richmond | | – | | – | 4 | – | 9 | .308 |
| North Carolina State | | – | | – | 2 | – | 5 | .286 |
| Bowling Green State | | – | | – | 3 | – | 8 | .273 |
| Auburn | | – | | – | 2 | – | 6 | .250 |
| Clemson | | – | | – | 2 | – | 6 | .250 |
| Southern California | | – | | – | 5 | – | 15 | .250 |
| Texas Christian | | – | | – | 1 | – | 3 | .250 |
| DePauw | | – | | – | 1 | – | 3 | .250 |
| Northern Colorado | | – | | – | 1 | – | 4 | .200 |
| Washington & Jefferson | | – | | – | 1 | – | 4 | .200 |
| Stanford | | – | | – | 2 | – | 9 | .182 |
| George Washington | | – | | – | 2 | – | 10 | .167 |
| Cincinnati | | – | | – | 1 | – | 9 | .100 |
| Idaho | | – | | – | 1 | – | 12 | .077 |
| Canisius | | – | | – | 0 | – | 4 | .000 |

The 1915–16 Colgate Raiders men's basketball team represented Colgate University during the 1915–16 college men's basketball season. The head coach was Walt Hammond, coaching the Raiders in his third season. The team had finished with a final record of 14–4. The team captain was Don Kennedy.

== Schedule ==
| Date time, TV | Opponent | Result | Record | Site city, state |
|---|---|---|---|---|
| * | Clarkson | W 49–18 | 1–0 | Hamilton, NY |
| * | Rochester | W 34–24 | 2–0 | Hamilton, NY |
| * | at Dartmouth | L 18–22 | 2–1 | Alumni Gym; Hanover, NH |
| * | at Springfield YMCA | W 40–28 | 3–1 | |
| * | at Wesleyan | W 35–20 | 4–1 | |
| * | at Pittsburgh | L 23–27 | 4–2 | Motor Square Garden; Pittsburgh, PA |
| * | at Carnegie Tech | W 43–28 | 5–2 | |
| * | at Westinghouse Club | W 33–20 | 6–2 | Pittsburgh, PA |
| * | Syracuse | W 35–25 | 7–2 | Hamilton, NY |
| * | at Rochester | W 29–23 | 8–2 | Rochester, NY |
| * | at Syracuse | L 11–16 | 8–3 | Archbold Gymnasium; Syracuse, NY |
| * | Carnegie Tech | W 43–29 | 9–3 | Hamilton, NY |
| * | at Albany Tech | W 62–15 | 10–3 | |
| * | at New York Univ. | W 35–23 | 11–3 | |
| * | Lafayette | L 23–33 | 11–4 | Scranton, PA |
| * | New York Univ. | W 23–22 | 12–4 | Hamilton, NY |
| * | at RPI | W 37–22 | 13–4 | |
| * | at Amherst | W 55–28 | 14–4 | Hamilton, NY |
*Non-conference game. (#) Tournament seedings in parentheses.
