= 1915–16 South Carolina Gamecocks men's basketball team =

American college basketball season

1915–16 South Carolina Gamecocks men's basketball
- Conference: Independent
- Record: 4–6
- Head coach: Charles C. Farrell (1st season)
- Home arena: none

1915–16 NCAA men's basketball independents standings
| | Conf. | | | | Overall |
| Team | W | | L | PCT | W | | L | PCT |
|---|---|---|---|---|---|---|---|---|
| Arizona | | – | | – | 5 | – | 0 | 1.000 |
| Carleton | | – | | – | 15 | – | 0 | 1.000 |
| North Dakota Agricultural | | – | | – | 18 | – | 0 | 1.000 |
| Roanoke | | – | | – | 9 | – | 0 | 1.000 |
| Tennessee | | – | | – | 12 | – | 0 | 1.000 |
| Utah | | – | | – | 11 | – | 0 | 1.000 |
| Allegheny | | – | | – | 10 | – | 1 | .909 |
| Montana State | | – | | – | 10 | – | 1 | .909 |
| Nebraska Wesleyan | | – | | – | 20 | – | 2 | .909 |
| Wake Forest | | – | | – | 16 | – | 2 | .889 |
| Pittsburgh | | – | | – | 15 | – | 2 | .882 |
| Seton Hall | | – | | – | 13 | – | 2 | .867 |
| Navy | | – | | – | 12 | – | 2 | .857 |
| Augustana (Ill.) | | – | | – | 11 | – | 2 | .846 |
| Dayton | | – | | – | 11 | – | 2 | .846 |
| Virginia | | – | | – | 11 | – | 2 | .846 |
| Ripon | | – | | – | 15 | – | 3 | .833 |
| Swarthmore | | – | | – | 10 | – | 2 | .833 |
| New Mexico | | – | | – | 9 | – | 2 | .818 |
| Wabash | | – | | – | 17 | – | 4 | .810 |
| Virginia Tech | | – | | – | 12 | – | 3 | .800 |
| Vanderbilt | | – | | – | 11 | – | 3 | .786 |
| Colgate | | – | | – | 14 | – | 4 | .778 |
| Duquesne | | – | | – | 7 | – | 2 | .778 |
| Georgia | | – | | – | 7 | – | 2 | .778 |
| Bucknell | | – | | – | 10 | – | 3 | .769 |
| Saint Mary's (Calif.) | | – | | – | 10 | – | 3 | .769 |
| Alabama | | – | | – | 13 | – | 4 | .765 |
| Millikin | | – | | – | 16 | – | 5 | .762 |
| Notre Dame | | – | | – | 9 | – | 3 | .750 |
| Syracuse | | – | | – | 9 | – | 3 | .750 |
| VMI | | – | | – | 9 | – | 3 | .750 |
| New York University | | – | | – | 11 | – | 4 | .733 |
| Oklahoma | | – | | – | 19 | – | 7 | .731 |
| Louisville | | – | | – | 8 | – | 3 | .727 |
| Penn State | | – | | – | 8 | – | 3 | .727 |
| Fordham | | – | | – | 10 | – | 4 | .714 |
| North Central | | – | | – | 12 | – | 5 | .706 |
| Detroit | | – | | – | 7 | – | 3 | .700 |
| Catholic | | – | | – | 9 | – | 4 | .692 |
| Central Missouri | | – | | – | 9 | – | 4 | .692 |
| Lake Forest | | – | | – | 9 | – | 4 | .692 |
| Gettysburg | | – | | – | 11 | – | 5 | .688 |
| Mississippi A&M | | – | | – | 11 | – | 5 | .688 |
| Santa Clara | | – | | – | 11 | – | 5 | .688 |
| Saint Louis | | – | | – | 13 | – | 6 | .684 |
| Kalamazoo | | – | | – | 6 | – | 3 | .667 |
| New Mexico A&M | | – | | – | 6 | – | 3 | .667 |
| The Citadel | | – | | – | 4 | – | 2 | .667 |
| North Carolina | | – | | – | 12 | – | 6 | .667 |
| Toledo | | – | | – | 2 | – | 1 | .667 |
| Fairmount | | – | | – | 10 | – | 5 | .667 |
| Buffalo | | – | | – | 7 | – | 4 | .636 |
| Delaware | | – | | – | 7 | – | 4 | .636 |
| Washington College | | – | | – | 7 | – | 4 | .636 |
| William & Mary | | – | | – | 7 | – | 4 | .636 |
| Connecticut | | – | | – | 5 | – | 3 | .625 |
| West Virginia | | – | | – | 11 | – | 7 | .611 |
| Denison | | – | | – | 9 | – | 6 | .600 |
| Georgetown | | – | | – | 9 | – | 6 | .600 |
| Millsaps | | – | | – | 6 | – | 4 | .600 |
| Montana | | – | | – | 6 | – | 4 | .600 |
| Mount Union | | – | | – | 6 | – | 4 | .600 |
| Union (N.Y.) | | – | | – | 9 | – | 6 | .600 |
| Wyoming | | – | | – | 3 | – | 2 | .600 |
| Louisiana State | | – | | – | 14 | – | 10 | .583 |
| Davidson | | – | | – | 11 | – | 8 | .579 |
| Indiana State | | – | | – | 7 | – | 2 | .778 |
| Kentucky | | – | | – | 8 | – | 6 | .571 |
| Southwestern (Kan.) | | – | | – | 8 | – | 6 | .571 |
| Grove City | | – | | – | 9 | – | 7 | .563 |
| Tulsa | | – | | – | 9 | – | 7 | .563 |
| Western State Normal | | – | | – | 9 | – | 7 | .563 |
| Tulane | | – | | – | 10 | – | 8 | .556 |
| St. Joseph's | | – | | – | 11 | – | 9 | .550 |
| North Dakota | | – | | – | 6 | – | 5 | .545 |
| Wisconsin–Stevens Point | | – | | – | 6 | – | 5 | .545 |
| CCNY | | – | | – | 7 | – | 6 | .538 |
| Temple | | – | | – | 7 | – | 6 | .538 |
| Ohio | | – | | – | 8 | – | 7 | .533 |
| Wooster | | – | | – | 8 | – | 7 | .533 |
| Lehigh | | – | | – | 12 | – | 11 | .522 |
| Akron | | – | | – | 5 | – | 5 | .500 |
| Boston University | | – | | – | 2 | – | 2 | .500 |
| Brigham Young | | – | | – | 3 | – | 3 | .500 |
| Michigan State | | – | | – | 8 | – | 8 | .500 |
| Oklahoma A&M | | – | | – | 7 | – | 8 | .467 |
| Muhlenberg | | – | | – | 5 | – | 6 | .455 |
| Trinity (N.C.) | | – | | – | 9 | – | 11 | .450 |
| Bradley | | – | | – | 8 | – | 10 | .444 |
| Lafayette | | – | | – | 7 | – | 9 | .438 |
| Butler | | – | | – | 3 | – | 4 | .429 |
| Rutgers | | – | | – | 3 | – | 4 | .429 |
| Washington and Lee | | – | | – | 6 | – | 8 | .429 |
| Army | | – | | – | 5 | – | 7 | .417 |
| Niagara | | – | | – | 4 | – | 6 | .400 |
| Rochester (N.Y.) | | – | | – | 6 | – | 9 | .400 |
| South Carolina | | – | | – | 4 | – | 6 | .400 |
| Rhode Island State | | – | | – | 3 | – | 5 | .375 |
| Ole Miss | | – | | – | 4 | – | 7 | .364 |
| Kent State | | – | | – | 4 | – | 8 | .333 |
| St. John's (NY) | | – | | – | 5 | – | 10 | .333 |
| Utah State | | – | | – | 2 | – | 4 | .333 |
| Washburn | | – | | – | 4 | – | 8 | .333 |
| Virginia Tech | | – | | – | 12 | – | 3 | .800 |
| Manhattan | | – | | – | 4 | – | 9 | .308 |
| Miami (Ohio) | | – | | – | 4 | – | 9 | .308 |
| Richmond | | – | | – | 4 | – | 9 | .308 |
| North Carolina State | | – | | – | 2 | – | 5 | .286 |
| Bowling Green State | | – | | – | 3 | – | 8 | .273 |
| Auburn | | – | | – | 2 | – | 6 | .250 |
| Clemson | | – | | – | 2 | – | 6 | .250 |
| Southern California | | – | | – | 5 | – | 15 | .250 |
| Texas Christian | | – | | – | 1 | – | 3 | .250 |
| DePauw | | – | | – | 1 | – | 3 | .250 |
| Northern Colorado | | – | | – | 1 | – | 4 | .200 |
| Washington & Jefferson | | – | | – | 1 | – | 4 | .200 |
| Stanford | | – | | – | 2 | – | 9 | .182 |
| George Washington | | – | | – | 2 | – | 10 | .167 |
| Cincinnati | | – | | – | 1 | – | 9 | .100 |
| Idaho | | – | | – | 1 | – | 12 | .077 |
| Canisius | | – | | – | 0 | – | 4 | .000 |

The 1915–16 South Carolina men's basketball team represented University of South Carolina during the 1915–16 college men's basketball season. The head coach was Charles C. Farrell, coaching the Gamecocks in his first season. The team finished with an overall record of 4–6.

== Schedule ==
| Date time, TV | Opponent | Result | Record | Site city, state |
|---|---|---|---|---|
| 1/8/1916* | Mills YMCA | W 49–15 | 1–0 | Columbia, SC |
| 1/12/1916* | Wofford | L 19–21 | 1–1 | Columbia, SC |
| 1/21/1916* | Clemson | W 41–20 | 2–1 | Columbia, SC |
| 2/4/1916* | Newberry | L 25–35 | 2–2 | Columbia, SC |
| 2/7/1916* | Furman | W 45–18 | 2–3 | Columbia, SC |
| 2/11/1916* | at Newberry | L 13–30 | 2–4 | Newberry, SC |
| 2/12/1916* | at Wofford | L 17–41 | 2–5 | Spartanburg, SC |
| 2/14/1916* | at Furman | L 23–29 | 3–5 | Greenville, SC |
| 2/18/1916* | The Citadel | W 29–25 | 4–5 | Columbia, SC |
| 2/26/1916* | at The Citadel | L 19–30 | 4–6 | Charleston, SC |
*Non-conference game. (#) Tournament seedings in parentheses.
