= 1915–16 Duquesne Dukes men's basketball team =

American college basketball season

1915–16 Duquesne Dukes men's basketball
- Conference: Independent
- Record: 7–2
- Head coach: Eugene McGuigan (2nd season)
- Home arena: Duquesne Garden

1915–16 NCAA men's basketball independents standings
| | Conf. | | | | Overall |
| Team | W | | L | PCT | W | | L | PCT |
|---|---|---|---|---|---|---|---|---|
| Arizona | | – | | – | 5 | – | 0 | 1.000 |
| Carleton | | – | | – | 15 | – | 0 | 1.000 |
| North Dakota Agricultural | | – | | – | 18 | – | 0 | 1.000 |
| Roanoke | | – | | – | 9 | – | 0 | 1.000 |
| Tennessee | | – | | – | 12 | – | 0 | 1.000 |
| Utah | | – | | – | 11 | – | 0 | 1.000 |
| Allegheny | | – | | – | 10 | – | 1 | .909 |
| Montana State | | – | | – | 10 | – | 1 | .909 |
| Nebraska Wesleyan | | – | | – | 20 | – | 2 | .909 |
| Wake Forest | | – | | – | 16 | – | 2 | .889 |
| Pittsburgh | | – | | – | 15 | – | 2 | .882 |
| Seton Hall | | – | | – | 13 | – | 2 | .867 |
| Navy | | – | | – | 12 | – | 2 | .857 |
| Augustana (Ill.) | | – | | – | 11 | – | 2 | .846 |
| Dayton | | – | | – | 11 | – | 2 | .846 |
| Virginia | | – | | – | 11 | – | 2 | .846 |
| Ripon | | – | | – | 15 | – | 3 | .833 |
| Swarthmore | | – | | – | 10 | – | 2 | .833 |
| New Mexico | | – | | – | 9 | – | 2 | .818 |
| Wabash | | – | | – | 17 | – | 4 | .810 |
| Virginia Tech | | – | | – | 12 | – | 3 | .800 |
| Vanderbilt | | – | | – | 11 | – | 3 | .786 |
| Colgate | | – | | – | 14 | – | 4 | .778 |
| Duquesne | | – | | – | 7 | – | 2 | .778 |
| Georgia | | – | | – | 7 | – | 2 | .778 |
| Bucknell | | – | | – | 10 | – | 3 | .769 |
| Saint Mary's (Calif.) | | – | | – | 10 | – | 3 | .769 |
| Alabama | | – | | – | 13 | – | 4 | .765 |
| Millikin | | – | | – | 16 | – | 5 | .762 |
| Notre Dame | | – | | – | 9 | – | 3 | .750 |
| Syracuse | | – | | – | 9 | – | 3 | .750 |
| VMI | | – | | – | 9 | – | 3 | .750 |
| New York University | | – | | – | 11 | – | 4 | .733 |
| Oklahoma | | – | | – | 19 | – | 7 | .731 |
| Louisville | | – | | – | 8 | – | 3 | .727 |
| Penn State | | – | | – | 8 | – | 3 | .727 |
| Fordham | | – | | – | 10 | – | 4 | .714 |
| North Central | | – | | – | 12 | – | 5 | .706 |
| Detroit | | – | | – | 7 | – | 3 | .700 |
| Catholic | | – | | – | 9 | – | 4 | .692 |
| Central Missouri | | – | | – | 9 | – | 4 | .692 |
| Lake Forest | | – | | – | 9 | – | 4 | .692 |
| Gettysburg | | – | | – | 11 | – | 5 | .688 |
| Mississippi A&M | | – | | – | 11 | – | 5 | .688 |
| Santa Clara | | – | | – | 11 | – | 5 | .688 |
| Saint Louis | | – | | – | 13 | – | 6 | .684 |
| Kalamazoo | | – | | – | 6 | – | 3 | .667 |
| New Mexico A&M | | – | | – | 6 | – | 3 | .667 |
| The Citadel | | – | | – | 4 | – | 2 | .667 |
| North Carolina | | – | | – | 12 | – | 6 | .667 |
| Toledo | | – | | – | 2 | – | 1 | .667 |
| Fairmount | | – | | – | 10 | – | 5 | .667 |
| Buffalo | | – | | – | 7 | – | 4 | .636 |
| Delaware | | – | | – | 7 | – | 4 | .636 |
| Washington College | | – | | – | 7 | – | 4 | .636 |
| William & Mary | | – | | – | 7 | – | 4 | .636 |
| Connecticut | | – | | – | 5 | – | 3 | .625 |
| West Virginia | | – | | – | 11 | – | 7 | .611 |
| Denison | | – | | – | 9 | – | 6 | .600 |
| Georgetown | | – | | – | 9 | – | 6 | .600 |
| Millsaps | | – | | – | 6 | – | 4 | .600 |
| Montana | | – | | – | 6 | – | 4 | .600 |
| Mount Union | | – | | – | 6 | – | 4 | .600 |
| Union (N.Y.) | | – | | – | 9 | – | 6 | .600 |
| Wyoming | | – | | – | 3 | – | 2 | .600 |
| Louisiana State | | – | | – | 14 | – | 10 | .583 |
| Davidson | | – | | – | 11 | – | 8 | .579 |
| Indiana State | | – | | – | 7 | – | 2 | .778 |
| Kentucky | | – | | – | 8 | – | 6 | .571 |
| Southwestern (Kan.) | | – | | – | 8 | – | 6 | .571 |
| Grove City | | – | | – | 9 | – | 7 | .563 |
| Tulsa | | – | | – | 9 | – | 7 | .563 |
| Western State Normal | | – | | – | 9 | – | 7 | .563 |
| Tulane | | – | | – | 10 | – | 8 | .556 |
| St. Joseph's | | – | | – | 11 | – | 9 | .550 |
| North Dakota | | – | | – | 6 | – | 5 | .545 |
| Wisconsin–Stevens Point | | – | | – | 6 | – | 5 | .545 |
| CCNY | | – | | – | 7 | – | 6 | .538 |
| Temple | | – | | – | 7 | – | 6 | .538 |
| Ohio | | – | | – | 8 | – | 7 | .533 |
| Wooster | | – | | – | 8 | – | 7 | .533 |
| Lehigh | | – | | – | 12 | – | 11 | .522 |
| Akron | | – | | – | 5 | – | 5 | .500 |
| Boston University | | – | | – | 2 | – | 2 | .500 |
| Brigham Young | | – | | – | 3 | – | 3 | .500 |
| Michigan State | | – | | – | 8 | – | 8 | .500 |
| Oklahoma A&M | | – | | – | 7 | – | 8 | .467 |
| Muhlenberg | | – | | – | 5 | – | 6 | .455 |
| Trinity (N.C.) | | – | | – | 9 | – | 11 | .450 |
| Bradley | | – | | – | 8 | – | 10 | .444 |
| Lafayette | | – | | – | 7 | – | 9 | .438 |
| Butler | | – | | – | 3 | – | 4 | .429 |
| Rutgers | | – | | – | 3 | – | 4 | .429 |
| Washington and Lee | | – | | – | 6 | – | 8 | .429 |
| Army | | – | | – | 5 | – | 7 | .417 |
| Niagara | | – | | – | 4 | – | 6 | .400 |
| Rochester (N.Y.) | | – | | – | 6 | – | 9 | .400 |
| South Carolina | | – | | – | 4 | – | 6 | .400 |
| Rhode Island State | | – | | – | 3 | – | 5 | .375 |
| Ole Miss | | – | | – | 4 | – | 7 | .364 |
| Kent State | | – | | – | 4 | – | 8 | .333 |
| St. John's (NY) | | – | | – | 5 | – | 10 | .333 |
| Utah State | | – | | – | 2 | – | 4 | .333 |
| Washburn | | – | | – | 4 | – | 8 | .333 |
| Virginia Tech | | – | | – | 12 | – | 3 | .800 |
| Manhattan | | – | | – | 4 | – | 9 | .308 |
| Miami (Ohio) | | – | | – | 4 | – | 9 | .308 |
| Richmond | | – | | – | 4 | – | 9 | .308 |
| North Carolina State | | – | | – | 2 | – | 5 | .286 |
| Bowling Green State | | – | | – | 3 | – | 8 | .273 |
| Auburn | | – | | – | 2 | – | 6 | .250 |
| Clemson | | – | | – | 2 | – | 6 | .250 |
| Southern California | | – | | – | 5 | – | 15 | .250 |
| Texas Christian | | – | | – | 1 | – | 3 | .250 |
| DePauw | | – | | – | 1 | – | 3 | .250 |
| Northern Colorado | | – | | – | 1 | – | 4 | .200 |
| Washington & Jefferson | | – | | – | 1 | – | 4 | .200 |
| Stanford | | – | | – | 2 | – | 9 | .182 |
| George Washington | | – | | – | 2 | – | 10 | .167 |
| Cincinnati | | – | | – | 1 | – | 9 | .100 |
| Idaho | | – | | – | 1 | – | 12 | .077 |
| Canisius | | – | | – | 0 | – | 4 | .000 |

The 1915–16 Duquesne Dukes men's basketball team represented Duquesne University during the 1915–16 college men's basketball season. The head coach was Eugene McGuigan coaching the Dukes in his second year. The team finished the season with an overall record of 7–2.

== Schedule ==
| Date time, TV | Opponent | Result | Record | Site city, state |
|---|---|---|---|---|
| December 20* | Beaver Falls Collegiates | W 28–13 | 1–0 | Duquesne Garden; Pittsburgh, PA |
| January 6* | Lafayette | W 26–24 | 2–0 | Duquesne Garden; Pittsburgh, PA |
| January 15* | Buffalo | W 33–19 | 3–0 | Duquesne Garden; Pittsburgh, PA |
| January 21* | at Grove City | W 31–26 | 4–0 | |
| February 9* | Waynesburg | W 34–15 | 5–0 | Duquesne Garden; Pittsburgh, PA |
| February 19* | Capital | W 43–18 | 6–0 | Duquesne Garden; Pittsburgh, PA |
| February 26* | Westinghouse Club | L 17–20 | 6–1 | Duquesne Garden; Pittsburgh, PA |
| March 4* | at Thiel | L 34–36 | 6–2 | Greenville, PA |
| March 7* | Thiel | W 76–11 | 7–2 | Duquesne Garden; Pittsburgh, PA |
*Non-conference game. (#) Tournament seedings in parentheses.
