= 1915–16 Trinity Blue and White men's basketball team =

American college basketball season

1915–16 Trinity Blue and White men's basketball
- Conference: Independent
- Record: 9–11
- Head coach: Bob Doak (1st season)
- Captain: Linville "Hip" Martin
- Home arena: The Ark

1915–16 NCAA men's basketball independents standings
	Conf.				Overall
Team	W		L	PCT	W		L	PCT
Arizona		–		–	5	–	0	1.000
Carleton		–		–	15	–	0	1.000
North Dakota Agricultural		–		–	18	–	0	1.000
Roanoke		–		–	9	–	0	1.000
Tennessee		–		–	12	–	0	1.000
Utah		–		–	11	–	0	1.000
Allegheny		–		–	10	–	1	.909
Montana State		–		–	10	–	1	.909
Nebraska Wesleyan		–		–	20	–	2	.909
Wake Forest		–		–	16	–	2	.889
Pittsburgh		–		–	15	–	2	.882
Seton Hall		–		–	13	–	2	.867
Navy		–		–	12	–	2	.857
Augustana (Ill.)		–		–	11	–	2	.846
Dayton		–		–	11	–	2	.846
Virginia		–		–	11	–	2	.846
Ripon		–		–	15	–	3	.833
Swarthmore		–		–	10	–	2	.833
New Mexico		–		–	9	–	2	.818
Wabash		–		–	17	–	4	.810
Virginia Tech		–		–	12	–	3	.800
Vanderbilt		–		–	11	–	3	.786
Colgate		–		–	14	–	4	.778
Duquesne		–		–	7	–	2	.778
Georgia		–		–	7	–	2	.778
Bucknell		–		–	10	–	3	.769
Saint Mary's (Calif.)		–		–	10	–	3	.769
Alabama		–		–	13	–	4	.765
Millikin		–		–	16	–	5	.762
Notre Dame		–		–	9	–	3	.750
Syracuse		–		–	9	–	3	.750
VMI		–		–	9	–	3	.750
New York University		–		–	11	–	4	.733
Oklahoma		–		–	19	–	7	.731
Louisville		–		–	8	–	3	.727
Penn State		–		–	8	–	3	.727
Fordham		–		–	10	–	4	.714
North Central		–		–	12	–	5	.706
Detroit		–		–	7	–	3	.700
Catholic		–		–	9	–	4	.692
Central Missouri		–		–	9	–	4	.692
Lake Forest		–		–	9	–	4	.692
Gettysburg		–		–	11	–	5	.688
Mississippi A&M		–		–	11	–	5	.688
Santa Clara		–		–	11	–	5	.688
Saint Louis		–		–	13	–	6	.684
Kalamazoo		–		–	6	–	3	.667
New Mexico A&M		–		–	6	–	3	.667
The Citadel		–		–	4	–	2	.667
North Carolina		–		–	12	–	6	.667
Toledo		–		–	2	–	1	.667
Fairmount		–		–	10	–	5	.667
Buffalo		–		–	7	–	4	.636
Delaware		–		–	7	–	4	.636
Washington College		–		–	7	–	4	.636
William & Mary		–		–	7	–	4	.636
Connecticut		–		–	5	–	3	.625
West Virginia		–		–	11	–	7	.611
Denison		–		–	9	–	6	.600
Georgetown		–		–	9	–	6	.600
Millsaps		–		–	6	–	4	.600
Montana		–		–	6	–	4	.600
Mount Union		–		–	6	–	4	.600
Union (N.Y.)		–		–	9	–	6	.600
Wyoming		–		–	3	–	2	.600
Louisiana State		–		–	14	–	10	.583
Davidson		–		–	11	–	8	.579
Indiana State		–		–	7	–	2	.778
Kentucky		–		–	8	–	6	.571
Southwestern (Kan.)		–		–	8	–	6	.571
Grove City		–		–	9	–	7	.563
Tulsa		–		–	9	–	7	.563
Western State Normal		–		–	9	–	7	.563
Tulane		–		–	10	–	8	.556
St. Joseph's		–		–	11	–	9	.550
North Dakota		–		–	6	–	5	.545
Wisconsin–Stevens Point		–		–	6	–	5	.545
CCNY		–		–	7	–	6	.538
Temple		–		–	7	–	6	.538
Ohio		–		–	8	–	7	.533
Wooster		–		–	8	–	7	.533
Lehigh		–		–	12	–	11	.522
Akron		–		–	5	–	5	.500
Boston University		–		–	2	–	2	.500
Brigham Young		–		–	3	–	3	.500
Michigan State		–		–	8	–	8	.500
Oklahoma A&M		–		–	7	–	8	.467
Muhlenberg		–		–	5	–	6	.455
Trinity (N.C.)		–		–	9	–	11	.450
Bradley		–		–	8	–	10	.444
Lafayette		–		–	7	–	9	.438
Butler		–		–	3	–	4	.429
Rutgers		–		–	3	–	4	.429
Washington and Lee		–		–	6	–	8	.429
Army		–		–	5	–	7	.417
Niagara		–		–	4	–	6	.400
Rochester (N.Y.)		–		–	6	–	9	.400
South Carolina		–		–	4	–	6	.400
Rhode Island State		–		–	3	–	5	.375
Ole Miss		–		–	4	–	7	.364
Kent State		–		–	4	–	8	.333
St. John's (NY)		–		–	5	–	10	.333
Utah State		–		–	2	–	4	.333
Washburn		–		–	4	–	8	.333
Virginia Tech		–		–	12	–	3	.800
Manhattan		–		–	4	–	9	.308
Miami (Ohio)		–		–	4	–	9	.308
Richmond		–		–	4	–	9	.308
North Carolina State		–		–	2	–	5	.286
Bowling Green State		–		–	3	–	8	.273
Auburn		–		–	2	–	6	.250
Clemson		–		–	2	–	6	.250
Southern California		–		–	5	–	15	.250
Texas Christian		–		–	1	–	3	.250
DePauw		–		–	1	–	3	.250
Northern Colorado		–		–	1	–	4	.200
Washington & Jefferson		–		–	1	–	4	.200
Stanford		–		–	2	–	9	.182
George Washington		–		–	2	–	10	.167
Cincinnati		–		–	1	–	9	.100
Idaho		–		–	1	–	12	.077
Canisius		–		–	0	–	4	.000

The 1915–16 Trinity Blue and White's basketball team represented Trinity College (later renamed Duke University) during the 1915–16 men's college basketball season. The head coach was Bob Doak, coaching his first season with Trinity. The team finished with an overall record of 9–11.

== Schedule ==
Date time, TV	Opponent	Result	Record	Site city, state
12/10/1915*	Durham YMCA	W 37–25	1–0	The Ark; Durham, NC
12/17/1915*	at Davidson	L 23–27	1–1	
12/18/1915*	at Charlotte YMCA	W 34–30	2–1	Charlotte, NC
12/19/1915*	at Asheville YMCA	L 25–32	2–2	Asheville, NC
12/20/1915*	at Asheville YMCA	W 42–37	3–2	Asheville, NC
12/21/1915*	at Statesville YMCA	L 28–31	3–3	
1/1/1916*	Wake Forest	L 26–28	3–4	
*	Unknown	T 0–0	4–4	
1/13/1916*	Statesville	W 45–13	5–4	The Ark; Durham, NC
1/20/1916*	Elon	W 37–22	6–4	The Ark; Durham, NC
2/8/1916*	at Cardinal A.C.	L 28–45	6–5	
2/9/1916*	Washington and Lee	L 19–33	6–6	
2/10/1916*	at VMI	L 20–34	6–7	
2/11/1916*	at Virginia	L 31–34	6–8	Charlottesville, VA
2/15/1916*	Davidson	W 38–22	7–8	The Ark; Durham, NC
2/19/1916*	at Elon	L 19–23	7–9	
2/23/1916*	at N.C. State	W 31–24	8–9	The Ark; Durham, NC
2/25/1916*	at Wake Forest	L 28–40	8–10	Winston-Salem, NC
2/26/1912*	at N.C. State	L 25–27	8–11	Raleigh, NC
2/29/1916*	N.C. State	W 61–28	9–11	The Ark; Durham, N.C.
*Non-conference game. (#) Tournament seedings in parentheses.
