= 1915–16 Navy Midshipmen men's basketball team =

American college basketball season

1915–16 Navy Midshipmen men's basketball
- Conference: Independent
- Record: 12–2
- Head coach: James Colliflower (1st season)
- Home arena: Dahlgren Hall

1915–16 NCAA men's basketball independents standings
| | Conf. | | | | Overall |
| Team | W | | L | PCT | W | | L | PCT |
|---|---|---|---|---|---|---|---|---|
| Arizona | | – | | – | 5 | – | 0 | 1.000 |
| Carleton | | – | | – | 15 | – | 0 | 1.000 |
| North Dakota Agricultural | | – | | – | 18 | – | 0 | 1.000 |
| Roanoke | | – | | – | 9 | – | 0 | 1.000 |
| Tennessee | | – | | – | 12 | – | 0 | 1.000 |
| Utah | | – | | – | 11 | – | 0 | 1.000 |
| Allegheny | | – | | – | 10 | – | 1 | .909 |
| Montana State | | – | | – | 10 | – | 1 | .909 |
| Nebraska Wesleyan | | – | | – | 20 | – | 2 | .909 |
| Wake Forest | | – | | – | 16 | – | 2 | .889 |
| Pittsburgh | | – | | – | 15 | – | 2 | .882 |
| Seton Hall | | – | | – | 13 | – | 2 | .867 |
| Navy | | – | | – | 12 | – | 2 | .857 |
| Augustana (Ill.) | | – | | – | 11 | – | 2 | .846 |
| Dayton | | – | | – | 11 | – | 2 | .846 |
| Virginia | | – | | – | 11 | – | 2 | .846 |
| Ripon | | – | | – | 15 | – | 3 | .833 |
| Swarthmore | | – | | – | 10 | – | 2 | .833 |
| New Mexico | | – | | – | 9 | – | 2 | .818 |
| Wabash | | – | | – | 17 | – | 4 | .810 |
| Virginia Tech | | – | | – | 12 | – | 3 | .800 |
| Vanderbilt | | – | | – | 11 | – | 3 | .786 |
| Colgate | | – | | – | 14 | – | 4 | .778 |
| Duquesne | | – | | – | 7 | – | 2 | .778 |
| Georgia | | – | | – | 7 | – | 2 | .778 |
| Bucknell | | – | | – | 10 | – | 3 | .769 |
| Saint Mary's (Calif.) | | – | | – | 10 | – | 3 | .769 |
| Alabama | | – | | – | 13 | – | 4 | .765 |
| Millikin | | – | | – | 16 | – | 5 | .762 |
| Notre Dame | | – | | – | 9 | – | 3 | .750 |
| Syracuse | | – | | – | 9 | – | 3 | .750 |
| VMI | | – | | – | 9 | – | 3 | .750 |
| New York University | | – | | – | 11 | – | 4 | .733 |
| Oklahoma | | – | | – | 19 | – | 7 | .731 |
| Louisville | | – | | – | 8 | – | 3 | .727 |
| Penn State | | – | | – | 8 | – | 3 | .727 |
| Fordham | | – | | – | 10 | – | 4 | .714 |
| North Central | | – | | – | 12 | – | 5 | .706 |
| Detroit | | – | | – | 7 | – | 3 | .700 |
| Catholic | | – | | – | 9 | – | 4 | .692 |
| Central Missouri | | – | | – | 9 | – | 4 | .692 |
| Lake Forest | | – | | – | 9 | – | 4 | .692 |
| Gettysburg | | – | | – | 11 | – | 5 | .688 |
| Mississippi A&M | | – | | – | 11 | – | 5 | .688 |
| Santa Clara | | – | | – | 11 | – | 5 | .688 |
| Saint Louis | | – | | – | 13 | – | 6 | .684 |
| Kalamazoo | | – | | – | 6 | – | 3 | .667 |
| New Mexico A&M | | – | | – | 6 | – | 3 | .667 |
| The Citadel | | – | | – | 4 | – | 2 | .667 |
| North Carolina | | – | | – | 12 | – | 6 | .667 |
| Toledo | | – | | – | 2 | – | 1 | .667 |
| Fairmount | | – | | – | 10 | – | 5 | .667 |
| Buffalo | | – | | – | 7 | – | 4 | .636 |
| Delaware | | – | | – | 7 | – | 4 | .636 |
| Washington College | | – | | – | 7 | – | 4 | .636 |
| William & Mary | | – | | – | 7 | – | 4 | .636 |
| Connecticut | | – | | – | 5 | – | 3 | .625 |
| West Virginia | | – | | – | 11 | – | 7 | .611 |
| Denison | | – | | – | 9 | – | 6 | .600 |
| Georgetown | | – | | – | 9 | – | 6 | .600 |
| Millsaps | | – | | – | 6 | – | 4 | .600 |
| Montana | | – | | – | 6 | – | 4 | .600 |
| Mount Union | | – | | – | 6 | – | 4 | .600 |
| Union (N.Y.) | | – | | – | 9 | – | 6 | .600 |
| Wyoming | | – | | – | 3 | – | 2 | .600 |
| Louisiana State | | – | | – | 14 | – | 10 | .583 |
| Davidson | | – | | – | 11 | – | 8 | .579 |
| Indiana State | | – | | – | 7 | – | 2 | .778 |
| Kentucky | | – | | – | 8 | – | 6 | .571 |
| Southwestern (Kan.) | | – | | – | 8 | – | 6 | .571 |
| Grove City | | – | | – | 9 | – | 7 | .563 |
| Tulsa | | – | | – | 9 | – | 7 | .563 |
| Western State Normal | | – | | – | 9 | – | 7 | .563 |
| Tulane | | – | | – | 10 | – | 8 | .556 |
| St. Joseph's | | – | | – | 11 | – | 9 | .550 |
| North Dakota | | – | | – | 6 | – | 5 | .545 |
| Wisconsin–Stevens Point | | – | | – | 6 | – | 5 | .545 |
| CCNY | | – | | – | 7 | – | 6 | .538 |
| Temple | | – | | – | 7 | – | 6 | .538 |
| Ohio | | – | | – | 8 | – | 7 | .533 |
| Wooster | | – | | – | 8 | – | 7 | .533 |
| Lehigh | | – | | – | 12 | – | 11 | .522 |
| Akron | | – | | – | 5 | – | 5 | .500 |
| Boston University | | – | | – | 2 | – | 2 | .500 |
| Brigham Young | | – | | – | 3 | – | 3 | .500 |
| Michigan State | | – | | – | 8 | – | 8 | .500 |
| Oklahoma A&M | | – | | – | 7 | – | 8 | .467 |
| Muhlenberg | | – | | – | 5 | – | 6 | .455 |
| Trinity (N.C.) | | – | | – | 9 | – | 11 | .450 |
| Bradley | | – | | – | 8 | – | 10 | .444 |
| Lafayette | | – | | – | 7 | – | 9 | .438 |
| Butler | | – | | – | 3 | – | 4 | .429 |
| Rutgers | | – | | – | 3 | – | 4 | .429 |
| Washington and Lee | | – | | – | 6 | – | 8 | .429 |
| Army | | – | | – | 5 | – | 7 | .417 |
| Niagara | | – | | – | 4 | – | 6 | .400 |
| Rochester (N.Y.) | | – | | – | 6 | – | 9 | .400 |
| South Carolina | | – | | – | 4 | – | 6 | .400 |
| Rhode Island State | | – | | – | 3 | – | 5 | .375 |
| Ole Miss | | – | | – | 4 | – | 7 | .364 |
| Kent State | | – | | – | 4 | – | 8 | .333 |
| St. John's (NY) | | – | | – | 5 | – | 10 | .333 |
| Utah State | | – | | – | 2 | – | 4 | .333 |
| Washburn | | – | | – | 4 | – | 8 | .333 |
| Virginia Tech | | – | | – | 12 | – | 3 | .800 |
| Manhattan | | – | | – | 4 | – | 9 | .308 |
| Miami (Ohio) | | – | | – | 4 | – | 9 | .308 |
| Richmond | | – | | – | 4 | – | 9 | .308 |
| North Carolina State | | – | | – | 2 | – | 5 | .286 |
| Bowling Green State | | – | | – | 3 | – | 8 | .273 |
| Auburn | | – | | – | 2 | – | 6 | .250 |
| Clemson | | – | | – | 2 | – | 6 | .250 |
| Southern California | | – | | – | 5 | – | 15 | .250 |
| Texas Christian | | – | | – | 1 | – | 3 | .250 |
| DePauw | | – | | – | 1 | – | 3 | .250 |
| Northern Colorado | | – | | – | 1 | – | 4 | .200 |
| Washington & Jefferson | | – | | – | 1 | – | 4 | .200 |
| Stanford | | – | | – | 2 | – | 9 | .182 |
| George Washington | | – | | – | 2 | – | 10 | .167 |
| Cincinnati | | – | | – | 1 | – | 9 | .100 |
| Idaho | | – | | – | 1 | – | 12 | .077 |
| Canisius | | – | | – | 0 | – | 4 | .000 |

The 1915–16 Navy Midshipmen men's basketball team represented the United States Naval Academy in intercollegiate basketball during the 1915–16 season. The head coach was James Colliflower, coaching his first season with the Midshipmen.

== Schedule ==
| Date time, TV | Opponent | Result | Record | Site city, state |
|---|---|---|---|---|
| Dec. 18, 1916* | at Loyola | W 30–20 | 1–0 | Baltimore, Maryland |
| * | George Washington | W 45–11 | 2–0 | Dahlgren Hall; Annapolis, Maryland |
| Dec. 30, 1916* no, no | at Penn | W 18–12 | 3–0 | Philadelphia, Pennsylvania |
| | New York U. | L 24–29 | 3–1 | New York, New York |
| Jan. 15, 1916 no, no | Catholic | W 21–19 | 4–1 | Dahlgren Hall; Annapolis, Maryland |
| Jan. 19, 1916 no, no | St. John's Md. | W 40–19 | 5–1 | Dahlgren Hall; Annapolis, Maryland |
| Jan. 22, 1916 no, no | at Georgetown | W 29–15 | 6–1 | Ryan Gymnasium; Washington, DC |
| Jan. 29, 1916 no, no | Brooklyn Poly. Inst. | W 23–17 | 7–1 | Dahlgren Hall; Annapolis, Maryland |
| Feb. 5, 1916 no, no | St. John's | W 52–36 | 8–1 | Dahlgren Hall; Annapolis, Maryland |
| Feb. 9, 1916 no, no | West Virginia Wesleyan | W 46–09 | 9–1 | Dahlgren Hall; Annapolis, Maryland |
| Feb. 12, 1916 no, no | Crescent Athletic Club | W 26–21 | 10–1 | Dahlgren Hall; Annapolis, Maryland |
| Feb. 19, 1916 no, no | Swarthmore | L 14–17 | 10–2 | Dahlgren Hall; Annapolis, Maryland |
| Feb. 21, 1916 no, no | Washington & Lee | W 28–17 | 11–2 | Dahlgren Hall; Annapolis, Maryland |
| Feb. 23, 1916 no, no | Virginia | W 35–26 | 12–2 | Dahlgren Hall; Annapolis, Maryland |
*Non-conference game. (#) Tournament seedings in parentheses.
