= 1915–16 Mississippi A&M Aggies men's basketball team =

American college basketball season

1915–16 Mississippi A&M Aggies men's basketball
- Conference: Southern Intercollegiate Athletic Association
- Record: 11–5 (5–5 SIAA)
- Head coach: Earl C. Hayes (5th season)

The 1915–16 Mississippi A&M Aggies basketball team represented Mississippi A&M College in the 1915–16 college basketball season.
