= 1915–16 Cincinnati Bearcats men's basketball team =

American college basketball season

1915–16 Cincinnati Bearcats men's basketball
- Conference: Ohio Athletic Conference
- Record: 1–9 (1–7 OAC)
- Head coach: George Little (3rd season)
- Captain: Earl Harrington
- Home arena: Schmidlapp Gymnasium

The 1915–16 Cincinnati Bearcats men's basketball team represented the University of Cincinnati during the 1915–16 college men's basketball season. The head coach was George Little, coaching his third season with the Bearcats.

== Schedule ==
Date time, TV	Opponent	Result	Record	Site city, state
January 14	at Kentucky	L 24–37	0–1	Buell Armory Gymnasium; Lexington, KY
January 21	Wittenberg	L 24–49	0–2	Schmidlapp Gymnasium; Cincinnati, OH
January 22	Kenyon	L 32–35	0–3	Schmidlapp Gymnasium; Cincinnati, OH
January 29	Miami (OH)	L 21–35	0–4	Schmidlapp Gymnasium; Cincinnati, OH
February 4	at Wittenberg	L 18–36	0–5	Springfield, OH
February 11	at Kenyon	W 31–15	1–5	Gambier, OH
February 19	Kentucky	L 10–34	1–6	Schmidlapp Gymnasium; Cincinnati, OH
February 25	Western Reserve	L 28–30	1–7	Schmidlapp Gymnasium; Cincinnati, OH
March 3	at Denison	L 9–47	1–8	Granville, OH
March 10	at Miami (OH)	L 16–37	1–9	Oxford, OH
*Non-conference game. (#) Tournament seedings in parentheses.
