= 1915–16 NCAA men's basketball season =

Men's collegiate basketball season

- Helms National Champions: Wisconsin (retroactive selection in 1943)
- Player of the Year (Helms): George Levis, Wisconsin (retroactive selection in 1944)

The 1915–16 NCAA men's basketball season began in December 1915, progressed through the regular season, and concluded in March 1916.

== Season headlines ==
- The National Collegiate Athletic Association (NCAA), Young Men’s Christian Association (YMCA), and Amateur Athletic Union (AAU) adopted a new set of rules nationally for amateur basketball in the United States, standardizing the rules used in college, YMCA, and AAU basketball. Officially appointed representatives of the three organizations prepared the uniform set of rules, the NCAA, YMCA, and AAU having decided that working together in this way was in the best interests of the game's welfare and of the organizations themselves.
- The Pacific Coast Conference began play with four original members, three of which fielded basketball teams for the 1915–16 season.
- Utah won the post-season Amateur Athletic Union (AAU) national championship tournament— in which a mix of collegiate and non-collegiate amateur teams competed — in 1916 to become the first of only four collegiate teams to win the tournament. No college team would win the tournament again until 1920.
- In February 1943, the Helms Athletic Foundation retroactively selected Wisconsin as its national champion for the 1915–16 season.
- In 1995, the Premo-Porretta Power Poll retroactively selected Wisconsin as its top-ranked team for the 1915–16 season.

== Rule changes ==
- "Class A" fouls — general fouls called for delay of game; "tackling" the ball (i.e., touching the ball while a teammate already was touching it); kicking, striking, advancing, or hugging the ball; tackling, holding, or pushing an opponent; and addressing the game officials — were changed to violations. "Class B" fouls — striking, kicking, shouldering, tripping, or hacking an opponent; unnecessary roughness; and using profane or abusive language — became technical and personal fouls.
- A player is disqualified after committing his fourth personal foul in a game. Previously, a player was disqualified if he committed two "Class B" fouls in a game.
- If a player was fouled in the act of shooting, his team was awarded two free-throw attempts regardless of whether he made the field goal. Previously, the shooting team had been awarded one point and one free-throw attempt if a shooter was fouled. If the shooting player made the shot, it counted for two points, just as it had before this rule change.
- The shooting team was awarded one free-throw attempt if a defending player interfered with the ball or basket while the ball was on the basket's rim. Previously, the shooting team had been awarded one point under these circusmtances.
- All players were required to wear plain numbers at least 6 inches (15.2 cm) high and 1 inch (2.54 cm) wide fastened securely on the backs of their shirts.

== Conference membership changes ==
School	Former Conference	New Conference
California Golden Bears	Independent	Pacific Coast Conference
Oregon Webfoots	Independent	No basketball team
Oregon Agricultural Beavers	Independent	Pacific Coast Conference
Washington Huskies	Independent	Pacific Coast Conference

NOTE: Although Oregon joined the Pacific Coast Conference in 1915, it did not field a basketball team during the 1915–16 season.

== Regular season ==
=== Conferences ===
==== Conference winners ====
Conference	Regular Season Winner	Conference Player of the Year	Conference Tournament	Tournament Venue (City)	Tournament Winner
Eastern Intercollegiate Basketball League	Penn	None selected	No Tournament		
Missouri Valley Intercollegiate Athletic Association	Nebraska	None selected	No Tournament		
Pacific Coast Conference	California & Oregon Agricultural	None selected	No Tournament		
Rocky Mountain Athletic Conference	Colorado & Colorado College		No Tournament		
Southwest Conference	Texas	None selected	No Tournament		
Western Conference	Wisconsin	None selected	No Tournament		

==== Conference standings ====
1915–16 Eastern Intercollegiate Basketball League standings
	Conf.				Overall
Team	W		L	PCT	W		L	PCT
Penn	8	–	2	.800	11	–	7	.611
Princeton	8	–	2	.800	16	–	4	.800
Cornell	5	–	5	.500	13	–	5	.722
Yale	5	–	5	.500	12	–	8	.600
Dartmouth	3	–	7	.300	11	–	12	.478
Columbia	1	–	9	.100	3	–	9	.250

1915–16 Rocky Mountain Conference standings
	Conf.				Overall
Team	W		L	PCT	W		L	PCT
Colorado College	6	–	2	.750	8	–	2	.800
Colorado	6	–	2	.750	6	–	2	.750
Denver	5	–	3	.625	7	–	3	.700
Colorado Agricultural	3	–	5	.375	6	–	6	.500
Colorado Mines	0	–	8	.000	0	–	8	.000

1915–16 Missouri Valley Intercollegiate Athletic Association men's basketball standings
	Conf.				Overall
Team	W		L	PCT	W		L	PCT
Nebraska	12	–	0	1.000	13	–	1	.929
Missouri	10	–	2	.833	13	–	3	.813
Kansas State	9	–	3	.750	9	–	3	.750
Kansas	5	–	11	.313	6	–	12	.333
Iowa State	2	–	8	.200	4	–	12	.250
Drake	1	–	5	.167	3	–	9	.250
Washington University	1	–	11	.083	6	–	11	.353

1915–16 Southwest Conference men's basketball standings
	Conf.				Overall
Team	W		L	PCT	W		L	PCT
Texas	6	–	0	1.000	12	–	0	1.000
Texas A&M	6	–	2	.750	11	–	2	.846
Rice	5	–	3	.625	12	–	5	.706
Southwestern (Tex.)	0	–	4	.000	0	–	4	.000
Baylor	0	–	8	.000	8	–	9	.471

1915–16 Pacific Coast Conference men's basketball standings
	Conf.				Overall
Team	W		L	PCT	W		L	PCT
Oregon Agricultural	5	–	3	.625	16	–	5	.762
California	5	–	3	.625	11	–	5	.688
Washington	2	–	6	.250	7	–	7	.500
Washington State		–		–	18	–	3	.857

1915–16 Western Conference men's basketball standings
	Conf.				Overall
Team	W		L	PCT	W		L	PCT
Wisconsin	11	–	1	.917	20	–	1	.952
Illinois	9	–	3	.750	13	–	3	.813
Northwestern	9	–	3	.750	13	–	3	.813
Minnesota	6	–	6	.500	11	–	6	.647
Indiana	3	–	5	.375	6	–	7	.462
Chicago	4	–	8	.333	15	–	11	.577
Iowa	2	–	4	.333	11	–	4	.733
Ohio State	2	–	8	.200	9	–	13	.409
Purdue	2	–	10	.167	4	–	10	.286

=== Independents ===
A total of 122 college teams played as major independents. Among independents that played at least 10 games, Carleton (15–0), North Dakota Agricultural (18–0), Tennessee (12–0), and Utah (11–0) were undefeated, and Nebraska Wesleyan (20–2) finished with the most wins.

1915–16 NCAA men's basketball independents standings
	Conf.				Overall
Team	W		L	PCT	W		L	PCT
Arizona		–		–	5	–	0	1.000
Carleton		–		–	15	–	0	1.000
North Dakota Agricultural		–		–	18	–	0	1.000
Roanoke		–		–	9	–	0	1.000
Tennessee		–		–	12	–	0	1.000
Utah		–		–	11	–	0	1.000
Allegheny		–		–	10	–	1	.909
Montana State		–		–	10	–	1	.909
Nebraska Wesleyan		–		–	20	–	2	.909
Wake Forest		–		–	16	–	2	.889
Pittsburgh		–		–	15	–	2	.882
Seton Hall		–		–	13	–	2	.867
Navy		–		–	12	–	2	.857
Augustana (Ill.)		–		–	11	–	2	.846
Dayton		–		–	11	–	2	.846
Virginia		–		–	11	–	2	.846
Ripon		–		–	15	–	3	.833
Swarthmore		–		–	10	–	2	.833
New Mexico		–		–	9	–	2	.818
Wabash		–		–	17	–	4	.810
Virginia Tech		–		–	12	–	3	.800
Vanderbilt		–		–	11	–	3	.786
Colgate		–		–	14	–	4	.778
Duquesne		–		–	7	–	2	.778
Georgia		–		–	7	–	2	.778
Bucknell		–		–	10	–	3	.769
Saint Mary's (Calif.)		–		–	10	–	3	.769
Alabama		–		–	13	–	4	.765
Millikin		–		–	16	–	5	.762
Notre Dame		–		–	9	–	3	.750
Syracuse		–		–	9	–	3	.750
VMI		–		–	9	–	3	.750
New York University		–		–	11	–	4	.733
Oklahoma		–		–	19	–	7	.731
Louisville		–		–	8	–	3	.727
Penn State		–		–	8	–	3	.727
Fordham		–		–	10	–	4	.714
North Central		–		–	12	–	5	.706
Detroit		–		–	7	–	3	.700
Catholic		–		–	9	–	4	.692
Central Missouri		–		–	9	–	4	.692
Lake Forest		–		–	9	–	4	.692
Gettysburg		–		–	11	–	5	.688
Mississippi A&M		–		–	11	–	5	.688
Santa Clara		–		–	11	–	5	.688
Saint Louis		–		–	13	–	6	.684
Kalamazoo		–		–	6	–	3	.667
New Mexico A&M		–		–	6	–	3	.667
The Citadel		–		–	4	–	2	.667
North Carolina		–		–	12	–	6	.667
Toledo		–		–	2	–	1	.667
Fairmount		–		–	10	–	5	.667
Buffalo		–		–	7	–	4	.636
Delaware		–		–	7	–	4	.636
Washington College		–		–	7	–	4	.636
William & Mary		–		–	7	–	4	.636
Connecticut		–		–	5	–	3	.625
West Virginia		–		–	11	–	7	.611
Denison		–		–	9	–	6	.600
Georgetown		–		–	9	–	6	.600
Millsaps		–		–	6	–	4	.600
Montana		–		–	6	–	4	.600
Mount Union		–		–	6	–	4	.600
Union (N.Y.)		–		–	9	–	6	.600
Wyoming		–		–	3	–	2	.600
Louisiana State		–		–	14	–	10	.583
Davidson		–		–	11	–	8	.579
Indiana State		–		–	7	–	2	.778
Kentucky		–		–	8	–	6	.571
Southwestern (Kan.)		–		–	8	–	6	.571
Grove City		–		–	9	–	7	.563
Tulsa		–		–	9	–	7	.563
Western State Normal		–		–	9	–	7	.563
Tulane		–		–	10	–	8	.556
St. Joseph's		–		–	11	–	9	.550
North Dakota		–		–	6	–	5	.545
Wisconsin–Stevens Point		–		–	6	–	5	.545
CCNY		–		–	7	–	6	.538
Temple		–		–	7	–	6	.538
Ohio		–		–	8	–	7	.533
Wooster		–		–	8	–	7	.533
Lehigh		–		–	12	–	11	.522
Akron		–		–	5	–	5	.500
Boston University		–		–	2	–	2	.500
Brigham Young		–		–	3	–	3	.500
Michigan State		–		–	8	–	8	.500
Oklahoma A&M		–		–	7	–	8	.467
Muhlenberg		–		–	5	–	6	.455
Trinity (N.C.)		–		–	9	–	11	.450
Bradley		–		–	8	–	10	.444
Lafayette		–		–	7	–	9	.438
Butler		–		–	3	–	4	.429
Rutgers		–		–	3	–	4	.429
Washington and Lee		–		–	6	–	8	.429
Army		–		–	5	–	7	.417
Niagara		–		–	4	–	6	.400
Rochester (N.Y.)		–		–	6	–	9	.400
South Carolina		–		–	4	–	6	.400
Rhode Island State		–		–	3	–	5	.375
Ole Miss		–		–	4	–	7	.364
Kent State		–		–	4	–	8	.333
St. John's (NY)		–		–	5	–	10	.333
Utah State		–		–	2	–	4	.333
Washburn		–		–	4	–	8	.333
Virginia Tech		–		–	12	–	3	.800
Manhattan		–		–	4	–	9	.308
Miami (Ohio)		–		–	4	–	9	.308
Richmond		–		–	4	–	9	.308
North Carolina State		–		–	2	–	5	.286
Bowling Green State		–		–	3	–	8	.273
Auburn		–		–	2	–	6	.250
Clemson		–		–	2	–	6	.250
Southern California		–		–	5	–	15	.250
Texas Christian		–		–	1	–	3	.250
DePauw		–		–	1	–	3	.250
Northern Colorado		–		–	1	–	4	.200
Washington & Jefferson		–		–	1	–	4	.200
Stanford		–		–	2	–	9	.182
George Washington		–		–	2	–	10	.167
Cincinnati		–		–	1	–	9	.100
Idaho		–		–	1	–	12	.077
Canisius		–		–	0	–	4	.000

== Awards ==
=== Helms College Basketball All-Americans ===
The practice of selecting a Consensus All-American Team did not begin until the 1928–29 season. The Helms Athletic Foundation later retroactively selected a list of All-Americans for the 1915–16 season.

Player	Team
Roy Bohler	Washington State
Bill Chandler	Wisconsin
Cyril Haas	Princeton
George Levis	Wisconsin
Clyde Littlefield	Texas
Edward McNichol	Penn
Dick Romney	Utah
Adolph Sieberts	Oregon Agricultural
Fred Williams	Missouri
Ray Woods	Illinois

=== Major player of the year awards ===
- Helms Player of the Year: George Levis, Wisconsin (retroactive selection in 1944)

== Coaching changes ==
A number of teams changed coaches during the season and after it ended.

Team	Former Coach	Interim Coach	New Coach	Reason
Alabama	Griff Harsh		Thomas Kelley	
Army	Jacob L. Devers		Arthur Conrad	
Boston University	Henry Crane		V. B. Allison	
California	Kilduff		Ben Cherrington	
Cincinnati	George Little		Ion Cortright	Little left to coach Miami (Ohio).
The Citadel	Hans Kangter		Harry J. O'Brien	
Clemson	Audley H. Ward		Country Morris	
Columbia	Harry A. Fisher		Carl J. Merner	Merner left Kansas State to coach Columbia.
Dartmouth	P. W. Loudon		J. A. Pelletier	
Denver	Charles Wingender		John Fike	
Detroit	Walter Hardy		Royal R. Campbell	
Drake	Ray Whisman		Ralph Glaze	
Georgia	Howell Peacock		W. A. Cunningham	Peacock left to coach at North Carolina.
Idaho	Charles M. Rademacher		Hec Edmundson	
Indiana	Allan Williford		Guy Lowman	
Kansas State	Carl J. Merner		Zora Clevenger	
Kentucky	Jim Park		William P. Tuttle	
Lafayette	Wilmer G. Crowell		J. B. Quig	
Lehigh	Harry Haring		Roy Geary	
Miami (OH)	Chester J. Roberts		George Little	
Michigan State	John Macklin		George Gauthier	
Missouri	Eugene Van Gent		John F. Miller	Van Gent left to coach at Texas.
Nebraska	Sam Waugh		E. J. Stewart	
North Carolina	Charles Doak		Howell Peacock	
Northern Colorado	Royce Long		Paul Abbott	
Oregon Agricultural	E. J. Stewart		Everett May	Stewart left to coach at Nebraska.
Purdue	Robert E. Vaughan		Ward Lambert	
Saint Louis	George Keogan		Armin Fischer	
Saint Mary's (Calif.)	Frank Boek		Otto Rittler	
South Carolina	Charles C. Farrell		Dixon Foster	
Southern California	Ralph Glaze		Motts Blair	
Tennessee	Zora Clevenger		John R. Bender	Clevenger left to coach at Kansas State.
Texas	Roy Henderson		Eugene Van Gent	
Texas A&M	D. V. Graves		W. H. H. Morris	
Trinity (N.C.)	Bob Doak		Charles Doak	
Virginia Tech	Branch Bocock		Harlan Sandborn	
Fairmount	Harry Buck		Lamar Hoover	
William & Mary	Dexter W. Draper		Samuel H. Hubbard	
Yale	Robert G. Stowe		A. Bernie Tommers	
