= List of Elon Phoenix men's basketball head coaches =

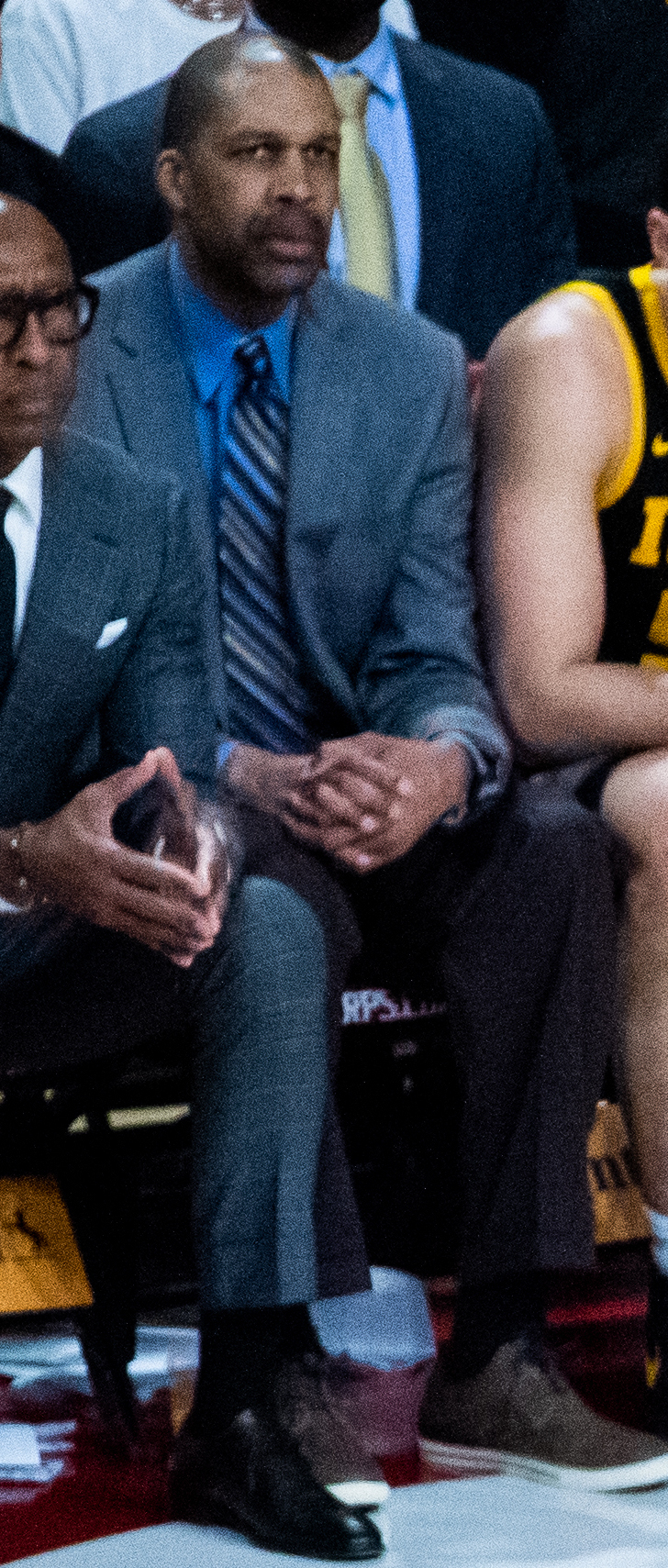
Billy Taylor, the current head coach of the Elon Phoenix.

The following is a list of Elon Phoenix men's basketball head coaches. There have been 19 head coaches of the Phoenix in their 114-season history.

Elon's current head coach is Billy Taylor. He was hired as the Phoenix's head coach in April 2022, replacing Mike Schrage, who resigned after the 2021–22 season to join the staff at Duke.

No.	Tenure	Coach	Years	Record	Pct.
–	1907–1911	Unknown	4	1–3	.250
1	1911–1915	Bob Doak	4	25–33–1	.432
2	1915–1920	Jack Johnson	5	21–50	.296
3	1920–1926	Frank Corboy	6	51–56	.477
4	1926–1927	William Jay	1	12–10	.545
5	1927–1937	Peahead Walker	10	123–90	.577
6	1937–1942	Horace Hendrickson	5	93–21	.816
7	1944–1946	Lacy Adcox	2	20–27	.426
8	1946–1947	Hap Perry	1	16–10	.615
9	1947–1948	Garland Causey	1	10–13	.435
10	1948–1949	Harold Pope	1	7–22	.241
11	1949–1959	Doc Mathis	10	161–118	.577
12	1959–1979	Bill Miller	20	329–225	.594
13	1979–1986	Bill Morningstar	7	101–100	.502
14	1986–1993	Bob Burton	7	115–85	.575
15	1993–2003	Mark Simons	10	109–169	.392
16	2003–2009	Ernie Nestor	6	67–117	.364
17	2009–2019	Matt Matheny	10	151–169	.472
18	2019–2022	Mike Schrage	3	33–52	.388
19	2022–present	Billy Taylor	4	52–77	.403
Totals		19 coaches	117 seasons	1,497–1,447	.508
Records updated through end of 2025–26 season Source
