= 1914–15 NCAA men's basketball season =

Men's collegiate basketball season

- Helms National Champions: Illinois (retroactive selection in 1943)
- Player of the Year (Helms): Ernest Houghton, Union (NY) (retroactive selection in 1944)

The 1914–15 NCAA men's basketball season began in December 1914, progressed through the regular season, and concluded in March 1915.

== Season headlines ==
- The Southwest Conference began play, with five original members.
- In February 1943, the Helms Athletic Foundation retroactively selected Illinois as its national champion for the 1914–15 season.
- In 1995, the Premo-Porretta Power Poll retroactively selected Illinois as its top-ranked team for the 1914–15 season.

== Conference membership changes ==
School	Former Conference	New Conference
Baylor Bears	Independent	Southwest Conference
Colorado College Tigers	No major basketball program	Rocky Mountain Athletic Conference
Rice Owls	No major basketball program	Southwest Conference
Southwestern (Tex.) Pirates	No major basketball program	Southwest Conference
Texas Longhorns	Independent	Southwest Conference
Texas A&M Aggies	Independent	Southwest Conference

== Regular season ==
=== Conferences ===
==== Conference winners ====
Conference	Regular Season Winner	Conference Player of the Year	Conference Tournament	Tournament Venue (City)	Tournament Winner
Eastern Intercollegiate Basketball League	Yale	None selected	No Tournament		
Missouri Valley Intercollegiate Athletic Association	Kansas	None selected	No Tournament		
Rocky Mountain Athletic Conference	Denver		No Tournament		
Southwest Conference	Texas	None selected	No Tournament		
Western Conference	Illinois	None selected	No Tournament		

==== Conference standings ====
1914–15 Eastern Intercollegiate Basketball League standings
	Conf.				Overall
Team	W		L	PCT	W		L	PCT
Yale	8	–	2	.800	14	–	3	.824
Cornell	7	–	3	.700	12	–	4	.750
Princeton	6	–	4	.600	13	–	5	.722
Columbia	6	–	4	.600	11	–	5	.688
Penn	3	–	7	.300	9	–	10	.474
Dartmouth	0	–	10	.000	6	–	11	.353

1914–15 Missouri Valley Intercollegiate Athletic Association men's basketball standings
	Conf.				Overall
Team	W		L	PCT	W		L	PCT
Kansas	13	–	1	.929	16	–	1	.941
Nebraska	8	–	4	.667	10	–	8	.556
Missouri	6	–	6	.500	8	–	6	.571
Iowa State	5	–	5	.500	6	–	7	.462
Kansas State	4	–	10	.286	7	–	11	.389
Drake	1	–	5	.167	5	–	6	.455
Washington University	1	–	7	.125	6	–	7	.462

1914–15 Rocky Mountain Conference standings
	Conf.				Overall
Team	W		L	PCT	W		L	PCT
Denver	8	–	0	1.000	8	–	0	1.000
Colorado Agricultural	6	–	2	.750	7	–	3	.700
Colorado	3	–	5	.375	4	–	6	.400
Colorado College	3	–	5	.375	3	–	5	.375
Colorado Mines	0	–	8	.000	0	–	8	.000

1914–15 Southwest Conference men's basketball standings
	Conf.				Overall
Team	W		L	PCT	W		L	PCT
Texas	5	–	0	1.000	14	–	0	1.000
Rice	5	–	1	.833	8	–	1	.889
Texas A&M	4	–	1	.800	13	–	2	.867
Southwestern (Tex.)	1	–	5	.167	1	–	5	.167
Baylor	0	–	8	.000	1	–	9	.100

1914–15 Western Conference men's basketball standings
	Conf.				Overall
Team	W		L	PCT	W		L	PCT
Illinois	12	–	0	1.000	16	–	0	1.000
Chicago	9	–	3	.750	20	–	5	.800
Wisconsin	8	–	4	.667	13	–	4	.765
Minnesota	6	–	6	.500	11	–	6	.647
Northwestern	5	–	5	.500	11	–	8	.579
Purdue	4	–	8	.333	5	–	8	.385
Ohio State	3	–	9	.250	7	–	10	.412
Iowa	2	–	6	.250	9	–	8	.529
Indiana	1	–	9	.100	4	–	9	.308

=== Independents ===
A total of 124 college teams played as major independents. Among independents that played at least 10 games, Virginia (17–0) was undefeated, and Virginia, Washington State (17–6), and Fordham (17–15) finished with the most wins.

1914–15 NCAA men's basketball independents standings
	Conf.				Overall
Team	W		L	PCT	W		L	PCT
Arizona		–		–	9	–	0	1.000
California		–		–	6	–	0	1.000
Kalamazoo		–		–	7	–	0	1.000
Virginia		–		–	17	–	0	1.000
St. Joseph's		–		–	14	–	1	.933
Union (N.Y.)		–		–	13	–	1	.929
Lake Forest		–		–	12	–	1	.923
Allegheny		–		–	11	–	1	.917
Louisiana State		–		–	10	–	1	.909
Syracuse		–		–	10	–	1	.909
Santa Clara		–		–	9	–	1	.900
New Mexico		–		–	8	–	1	.889
Seton Hall		–		–	15	–	2	.882
Mount Union		–		–	7	–	1	.875
Denison		–		–	12	–	2	.857
Duquesne		–		–	12	–	2	.857
Washington		–		–	12	–	2	.857
Army		–		–	11	–	2	.846
Carleton		–		–	11	–	2	.846
Whittier		–		–	16	–	3	.842
Franklin		–		–	10	–	2	.833
North Dakota State		–		–	10	–	2	.833
Notre Dame		–		–	14	–	3	.824
Navy		–		–	9	–	2	.818
Tennessee		–		–	9	–	2	.818
VMI		–		–	8	–	2	.800
Washington College		–		–	11	–	3	.786
Pittsburgh		–		–	14	–	4	.778
Wabash		–		–	7	–	2	.778
Penn State		–		–	10	–	3	.769
Central Missouri		–		–	13	–	4	.765
Brigham Young		–		–	6	–	2	.750
Nebraska Wesleyan		–		–	12	–	4	.750
St. John's (NY)		–		–	12	–	4	.750
Utah		–		–	12	–	4	.750
Wake Forest		–		–	12	–	4	.750
Washington State		–		–	17	–	6	.739
Colgate		–		–	11	–	4	.733
Millikin		–		–	11	–	4	.733
Ohio		–		–	11	–	4	.733
Bradley		–		–	13	–	5	.722
The Citadel		–		–	5	–	2	.714
Grinnell		–		–	10	–	4	.714
Manhattan		–		–	10	–	4	.714
Nevada		–		–	5	–	2	.714
Oklahoma A&M		–		–	10	–	4	.714
Roanoke		–		–	10	–	4	.714
Muhlenberg		–		–	12	–	5	.706
Temple		–		–	9	–	4	.692
Virginia Tech		–		–	9	–	4	.692
Grove City		–		–	13	–	6	.684
Northern Colorado		–		–	2	–	1	.667
Southwestern (Kan.)		–		–	10	–	5	.667
Tulsa		–		–	6	–	3	.667
Alabama		–		–	7	–	4	.636
Augustana (Ill.)		–		–	7	–	4	.636
North Dakota		–		–	7	–	4	.636
Millsaps		–		–	5	–	3	.625
Rochester (N.Y.)		–		–	10	–	6	.625
Saint Mary's (Calif.)		–		–	5	–	3	.625
Kent State		–		–	3	–	2	.600
Kentucky		–		–	7	–	5	.583
Oklahoma		–		–	7	–	5	.583
Western State Normal		–		–	7	–	5	.583
Georgia		–		–	4	–	3	.571
Loyola (Md.)		–		–	8	–	6	.571
Mississippi A&M		–		–	8	–	6	.571
Lehigh		–		–	9	–	7	.563
Indiana State		–		–	7	–	6	.538
Fordham		–		–	17	–	15	.531
Tempe Normal		–		–	2	–	2	.500
Canisius		–		–	5	–	5	.500
Davidson		–		–	3	–	3	.500
Dayton		–		–	4	–	4	.500
Georgetown		–		–	8	–	8	.500
Trinity (N.C.)		–		–	10	–	10	.500
Gettysburg		–		–	9	–	9	.500
Marietta		–		–	7	–	7	.500
New York University		–		–	6	–	6	.500
North Carolina State		–		–	5	–	5	.500
Oregon Agricultural		–		–	10	–	10	.500
Vanderbilt		–		–	6	–	6	.500
West Virginia		–		–	10	–	10	.500
Wisconsin–Stevens Point		–		–	5	–	5	.500
TCU		–		–	11	–	12	.478
Niagara		–		–	8	–	9	.471
Washburn		–		–	5	–	6	.455
Louisville		–		–	4	–	5	.444
Stanford		–		–	4	–	5	.444
Michigan State		–		–	7	–	9	.438
Butler		–		–	3	–	4	.429
William & Mary		–		–	5	–	8	.385
New Mexico A&M		–		–	3	–	4	.429
Springfield (Mass.)		–		–	6	–	8	.429
CCNY		–		–	5	–	7	.417
Delaware		–		–	5	–	7	.417
Oregon		–		–	7	–	10	.412
Montana		–		–	4	–	6	.400
Montana State		–		–	4	–	6	.400
Tulane		–		–	2	–	3	.400
Washington & Jefferson		–		–	4	–	6	.400
Washington and Lee		–		–	5	–	8	.385
William & Mary		–		–	5	–	8	.385
Auburn		–		–	3	–	5	.375
Detroit		–		–	3	–	5	.375
North Carolina		–		–	6	–	10	.375
Richmond		–		–	3	–	5	.375
George Washington		–		–	5	–	9	.357
Idaho		–		–	5	–	9	.357
Southern California		–		–	3	–	6	.333
Wooster		–		–	5	–	10	.333
Wyoming		–		–	2	–	4	.333
Bucknell		–		–	5	–	11	.313
Miami (Ohio)		–		–	4	–	9	.308
Clemson		–		–	2	–	5	.286
Lafayette		–		–	4	–	10	.286
Fairmount		–		–	4	–	10	.286
Cincinnati		–		–	3	–	8	.273
South Carolina		–		–	2	–	7	.222
Connecticut		–		–	1	–	4	.200
Akron		–		–	2	–	10	.167
Utah State		–		–	1	–	5	.167
Rutgers		–		–	1	–	8	.111
Ole Miss		–		–	0	–	3	.000

== Awards ==
=== Helms College Basketball All-Americans ===
The practice of selecting a Consensus All-American Team did not begin until the 1928–29 season. The Helms Athletic Foundation later retroactively selected a list of All-Americans for the 1914–15 season.

Player	Team
W. P. Arnold	Yale
Leslie Brown	Cornell
Ernest Houghton	Union (NY)
Charlie Lee	Columbia
George Levis	Wisconsin
Elmer Oliphant	Purdue
Tony Savage	Washington
Ralph Sproull	Kansas
Wellington Strickley	Virginia
Ray Woods	Illinois

=== Major player of the year awards ===
- Helms Player of the Year: Ernest Houghton, Union (NY) (retroactive selection in 1944)

== Coaching changes ==
A number of teams changed coaches during the season and after it ended.

Team	Former Coach	Interim Coach	New Coach	Reason
Akron	Frank Haggerty		Fred Sefton	
Alabama	D. V. Graves		Griff Harsh	Graves left to coach at Texas A&M
Clemson	John W. Erwin		Audley H. Ward	
Connecticut	No coach		John F. Donahue	After the season, Donahue became Connecticut's first coach.
Dayton	Al Mahrt		Alfred McCray	
George Washington	Nathan Dougherty		George Colliflower	
Idaho	John G. Griffith		Charles M. Rademacher	Griffith left to coach Oklahoma A&M
Indiana	Arthur Berndt		Allan Williford	
Iowa State	Homer C. Hubbard		H. H. Walters	
Kent State	Alexandr Whyte		Donald Ulrich	
Kentucky	Alpha Brumage		Jim Park	
Lehigh	S. E. Muthart		Harry Haring	
Miami (OH)	Howard Flack		Chester J. Roberts	
Navy	Albert Cohan		James Colliflower	
NC State	H. S. Tucker		Chuck Sandborn	
Nebraska	Ewald Stiehm		Sam Waugh	
Niagara	A. V. Barnett		Tom Tracey	
North Dakota State	Howard Wood		Paul J. Davis	
Oklahoma A&M	Paul J. Davis		John G. Griffith	
Rutgers	George Davison		Frank Hill	Hill was also the coach of Seton Hall and St. Benedict's Prep School.
Saint Mary's (Calif.)	Fred Broderick		Frank Boek	
South Carolina	L. W. Hill		Charles C. Farrell	
Stanford	H. W. Maloney		E. C. Behrens	
TCU	Fred Cahoon		Ewing Y. Freeland	
Texas	L. Theo Bellmont		Roy Henderson	
Texas A&M	F. D. Steger		D. V. Graves	
Trinity (N.C.)	Nobel Clay		Bob Doak	
Tulane	Edwin Sweetland		Clark Shaughnessy	
Tulsa	Forest Rees		Francis Schmidt	
Wyoming	Ralph Thacker		John Corbett	
