= List of Elon Phoenix head football coaches =

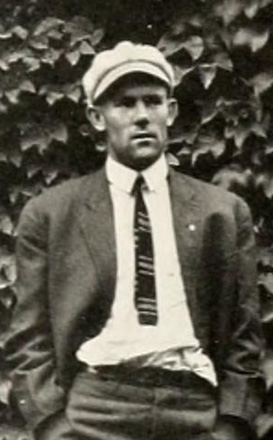
Reddy Rowe was the first head coach at Elon.

The Elon Phoenix football program is a college football team that represents Elon University in the Colonial Athletic Association Football Conference (CAAFC), a part of the NCAA Division I Football Championship Subdivision. The team has had 21 head coaches since its first recorded football game in 1909. Since December 2018, Tony Trisciani has served as head coach at Elon.

== Key ==
Key to symbols in coaches list
General		Overall		Conference		Postseason (Note: Although the first Rose Bowl Game was played in 1902, it has been continuously played since the 1916 game, and is recognized as the oldest bowl game by the NCAA. "—" indicates any season prior to 1916 when postseason games were not played.)	
No.	Order of coaches (Note: A running total of the number of head coaches, with coaches who served separate tenures being counted only once. Interim head coaches are represented with "Int" and are not counted in the running total. "—" indicates the team played but either without a coach or no coach is on record. "X" indicates an interim year without play.)	GC	Games coached	CW	Conference wins	PW	Postseason wins
DC	Division championships	OW	Overall wins	CL	Conference losses	PL	Postseason losses
CC	Conference championships	OL	Overall losses	CT	Conference ties	PT	Postseason ties
NC	National championships	OT	Overall ties (Note: Overtime rules in college football were introduced in 1996, making ties impossible in the period since.)	C%	Conference winning percentage		
†	Elected to the College Football Hall of Fame	O%	Overall winning percentage (Note: When computing the win–loss percentage, a tie counts as half a win and half a loss.)				

== Coaches ==
List of head football coaches showing season(s) coached, overall records, conference records, postseason records, championships and selected awards (Note: Statistics correct as of the end of the 2025 NCAA Division I FCS football season.)
No.	Name	Season(s) (Note: Elon did not field a team for their 1910–1918 and 1942–1945 seasons.)	GC	OW	OL	OT	O%	CW	CL	CT	C%	PW	PL	PT	DC	CC	NC	Awards
1	Reddy Rowe	1909	5	4	1	0	0.800	–	–	–	–	–	–	–	–	–	0	–
2	Jack Johnson	1919	3	1	2	0	0.333	–	–	–	–	–	–	–	–	–	0	–
3	Frank Corboy	1920–1925	51	17	31	3	0.363	–	–	–	–	–	–	–	–	–	0	–
4	A. R. Van Cleave	1926	10	0	10	0	.000	–	–	–	–	–	–	–	–	–	0	–
5	Peahead Walker	1927–1936	88	44	41	3	0.517	17	5	2	0.750	–	–	–	–	4	0	–
6	Horace Hendrickson	1937–1941	44	31	12	1	0.716	22	5	0	0.815	–	–	–	–	2	0	–
7	Hap Perry	1946–1947	20	8	11	1	0.425	3	9	1	0.269	–	–	–	–	0	0	–
8	James Mallory	1948–1952	49	28	18	3	0.602	19	14	2	0.571	–	–	–	–	0	0	–
9	Sid Varney	1953–1959	62	24	36	2	0.403	17	21	2	0.450	–	–	–	–	0	0	–
10	George Tucker	1960–1964	50	29	20	1	0.590	18	12	1	0.597	–	–	–	–	2	0	–
11	Gary Mattocks	1965–1966	20	3	17	0	0.150	1	13	0	0.071	–	–	–	–	0	0	–
12	Shirley Wilson	1967–1976	108	72	34	2	0.676	41	11	2	0.778	2	3	–	–	6	0	–
13	Jerry Tolley	1977–1981	62	49	11	2	0.806	27	7	1	0.786	8	1	–	–	4	2 – 1980; 1981	NAIA Division I Coach of the Year (1980)
14	Wright Anderson	1982–1983	20	14	6	0	0.700	9	5	0	0.643	0	0	–	–	0	0	–
15	Macky Carden	1984–1988	51	34	17	0	0.667	23	12	0	0.657	0	0	–	–	0	0	–
16	Leon Hart	1989–1995	74	37	37	0	0.500	23	26	0	0.469	0	0	–	–	0	0	–
17	Al Seagraves	1996–2003	89	40	49	–	0.449	7	11	–	0.389	0	0	–	–	0	0	–
18	Paul Hamilton	2004–2005	20	6	14	–	0.300	2	12	–	0.143	0	0	–	–	0	0	–
19	Pete Lembo	2006–2010	57	35	22	–	0.614	24	14	–	0.632	0	1	–	–	0	0	–
20	Jason Swepson	2011–2013	34	10	24	–	0.294	5	19	–	0.208	0	0	–	–	0	0	–
21	Rich Skrosky	2014–2016	34	7	27	–	0.206	4	20	–	0.167	0	0	–	–	0	0	–
22	Curt Cignetti	2017–2018	23	14	9	–	0.609	10	5	–	0.667	0	2	–	–	0	0	–
23	Tony Trisciani	2019–present	75	38	37	–	0.507	30	22	–	0.577	0	1	–	–	0	0	–
