= 1915 NCAA Men's Basketball All-Americans =

- Awarded for: 1914–15 NCAA men's basketball season

The 1915 College Basketball All-American team, as chosen retroactively by the Helms Athletic Foundation. The player highlighted in gold was chosen as the Helms Foundation College Basketball Player of the Year retroactively in 1944.

Player	Team
W. P. Arnold	Yale
Leslie Brown	Cornell
Ernest Houghton	Union (NY)
Charlie Lee	Columbia
George Levis	Wisconsin
Elmer Oliphant	Purdue
Tony Savage	Washington
Ralph Sproull	Kansas
Wellington Strickley	Virginia
Ray Woods	Illinois

== See also ==
- 1914–15 NCAA men's basketball season
