= 1915–16 Iowa State Cyclones men's basketball team =

American college basketball season

1915–16 Iowa State Cyclones men's basketball
- Conference: Missouri Valley Intercollegiate Athletic Association
- Record: 4–12 (2–8 MVIAA)
- Head coach: Harter Walter (1st season)
- Home arena: State Gymnasium

1915–16 Missouri Valley Intercollegiate Athletic Association men's basketball standings
	Conf.				Overall
Team	W		L	PCT	W		L	PCT
Nebraska	12	–	0	1.000	13	–	1	.929
Missouri	10	–	2	.833	13	–	3	.813
Kansas State	9	–	3	.750	9	–	3	.750
Kansas	5	–	11	.313	6	–	12	.333
Iowa State	2	–	8	.200	4	–	12	.250
Drake	1	–	5	.167	3	–	9	.250
Washington University	1	–	11	.083	6	–	11	.353

The 1915–16 Iowa State Cyclones men's basketball team (also known informally as Ames) represented Iowa State University during the 1915–16 NCAA men's basketball season. The Cyclones were coached by Harter Walter, who was in his first season with the Cyclones. They played their home games at the State Gymnasium in Ames, Iowa.

They finished the season 4–12, 2–8 in Missouri Valley play to finish in fifth place.

== Roster ==
1915–16 Iowa State Cyclones men's basketball team
Players
Coaches

Pos.	#	Name	Height	Weight	Year	Hometown
G		Aldrich	—	—
G		W.H. Boynton	—	—
F		S.S. Bragdon	—	—
F		Green	—	—
		Griffith	—	—
F		Harry Hahn	—	—
		Harper	—	—
C		Earl A. Holmes (C)	—	—
		Miller	—	—
		Moss	—	—
F		Porterfield	—	—
F		Sweeney	—	—
G		Tomlinson	—	—
		Townsend	—	—
		Wolrab	—	—

Head coach

- Harter Walter

Assistant coach(es)

Legend

- (C) Team captain
- (S) Suspended
- (I) Ineligible
- (W) Walk-on
- Injured
- Current redshirt

== Schedule and results ==
Date time, TV	Rank^{#}	Opponent^{#}	Result	Record	Site city, state
Regular season
January 1, 1916*		at Fort Dodge Company G	W 26–20	1–0	Fort Dodge Armory; Fort Dodge, Iowa
January 4, 1916*		Coe	L 16–17	1–1	State Gymnasium; Ames, Iowa
January 7, 1916		at Kansas	L 25–26	1–2 (0–1)	Robinson Gymnasium; Lawrence, Kansas
January 8, 1916		at Kansas	W 24–21	2–2 (1–1)	Robinson Gymnasium; Lawrence, Kansas
January 14, 1916		Missouri	L 12–26	2–3 (1–2)	State Gymnasium; Ames, Iowa
January 15, 1916		Missouri	L 15–21	2–4 (1–3)	State Gymnasium; Ames, Iowa
January 21, 1916*		Grinnell	W 16–9	3–4	State Gymnasium; Ames, Iowa
February 4, 1916		at Nebraska	L 21–35	3–5 (1–4)	Grant Memorial Hall; Lincoln, Nebraska
February 5, 1916		at Nebraska	L 14–31	3–6 (1–5)	Grant Memorial Hall; Lincoln, Nebraska
February 8, 1916		Drake; Iowa Big Four	W 23–19	4–6 (2–5)	State Gymnasium; Ames, Iowa
February 11, 1916*		at Grinnell	L 7–19	4–7	Grinnell, Iowa
February 19, 1916*		at Iowa; CyHawk Rivalry	L 9–26	4–8	First Iowa Armory; Iowa City, Iowa
February 25, 1916		Nebraska	L 14–23	4–9 (2–6)	State Gymnasium; Ames, Iowa
February 26, 1916		Nebraska	L 17–29	4–10 (2–7)	State Gymnasium; Ames, Iowa
March 1, 1916; 7:30 pm		at Drake; Iowa Big Four	L 12–24	4–11 (2–8)	Alumni Gymnasium; Des Moines, Iowa
March 4, 1916*		Iowa; CyHawk Rivalry	L 12–23	4–12	State Gymnasium; Ames, Iowa
*Non-conference game. ^{#}Rankings from AP poll. (#) Tournament seedings in parentheses. All times are in Central Time.
