= 1914–15 Iowa State Cyclones men's basketball team =

American college basketball season

1914–15 Iowa State Cyclones men's basketball
- Conference: Missouri Valley Intercollegiate Athletic Association
- Record: 6–7 (5–5 MVIAA)
- Head coach: Homer Hubbard (4th season)
- Assistant coach: Harter Walter
- Home arena: State Gymnasium

1914–15 Missouri Valley Intercollegiate Athletic Association men's basketball standings
	Conf.				Overall
Team	W		L	PCT	W		L	PCT
Kansas	13	–	1	.929	16	–	1	.941
Nebraska	8	–	4	.667	10	–	8	.556
Missouri	6	–	6	.500	8	–	6	.571
Iowa State	5	–	5	.500	6	–	7	.462
Kansas State	4	–	10	.286	7	–	11	.389
Drake	1	–	5	.167	5	–	6	.455
Washington University	1	–	7	.125	6	–	7	.462

The 1914–15 Iowa State Cyclones men's basketball team (also known informally as Ames) represented Iowa State University during the 1914–15 NCAA men's basketball season. The Cyclones were coached by Homer Hubbard, who was in his fourth and last season with the Cyclones. They played their home games at the State Gymnasium in Ames, Iowa.

They finished the season 6–7, 5–5 in Missouri Valley play to finish in fourth place.

== Roster ==
1914–15 Iowa State Cyclones men's basketball team
Players
Coaches

Pos.	#	Name	Height	Weight	Year	Hometown
F		Arp	—	—		Marion, Iowa
		Abbott	—	—		Muscatine, Iowa
G		W.H. Boynton	—	—		Nevada, Iowa
G		S.S. Bragdon	—	—		Waterloo, Iowa
C		Burrus	—	—
G		Cramer	—	—
		Davis	—	—		Huron, South Dakota
		Dowell	—	—		Bedford, Iowa
		Elson	—	—		Shellsburg, Iowa
		Frost	—	—		Arnolds Park, Iowa
		Gaylord	—	—		Grinnell, Iowa
		Henderson	—	—		Randall, Iowa
C		Earl A. Holmes	—	—		Sioux City, Iowa
		Houdek	—	—		Muscatine, Iowa
		Howe	—	—		Fargo, North Dakota
G		Kelly	—	—
		Kerrigan	—	—		Davenport, Iowa
F		Lovelace	—	—		Marion, Alabama
		Mason	—	—		Union, Iowa
F		L.C. McDonald	—	—		Waterloo, Iowa
		Meister	—	—		Keokuk, Iowa
		Miller	—	—		Waterloo, Iowa
F		Morgan	—	—		Carlisle, Iowa
F		Drury Moss	—	—
C		Noble	—	—
		Oviatt	—	—		Huron, South Dakota
F		Porterfield	—	—		Waterloo, Iowa
		Renshaw	—	—		Rushmore, Iowa
		Rue	—	—		Harrisburg, Kentucky
F		J.D. "Chick" Swiney (C)	—	—		Davenport, Iowa

Head coach

- Homer Hubbard

Assistant coach(es)

- Harter Walter

Legend

- (C) Team captain
- (S) Suspended
- (I) Ineligible
- (W) Walk-on
- Injured
- Current redshirt

== Schedule and results ==
Date time, TV	Rank^{#}	Opponent^{#}	Result	Record	Site city, state
Regular season
January 8, 1915		Kansas	L 22–29	0–1 (0–1)	State Gymnasium; Ames, Iowa
January 9, 1915		Kansas	L 23–27 ^{OT}	0–2 (0–2)	State Gymnasium; Ames, Iowa
January 15, 1915		at Nebraska	L 15–32	0–3 (0–3)	Grant Memorial Hall; Lincoln, Nebraska
January 16, 1915		at Nebraska	L 12–23	0–4 (0–4)	Grant Memorial Hall; Lincoln, Nebraska
January 21, 1915*		Grinnell	W 20–19	1–4	State Gymnasium; Ames, Iowa
February 12, 1915		Nebraska	L 12–24	1–5 (0–5)	State Gymnasium; Ames, Iowa
February 13, 1915		Nebraska	W 25–11	2–5 (1–5)	State Gymnasium; Ames, Iowa
February 16, 1915*		at Iowa; CyHawk Rivalry	L 12–27	2–6	First Iowa Armory; Iowa City, Iowa
February 24, 1915; 7:30 pm		at Drake; Iowa Big Four	W 21–20	3–6 (2–5)	Alumni Gymnasium; Des Moines, Iowa
February 26, 1915		Kansas State	W 15–14	4–6 (3–5)	State Gymnasium; Ames, Iowa
February 27, 1915		Kansas State	W 25–19	5–6 (4–5)	State Gymnasium; Ames, Iowa
March 2, 1915; 4:00 pm		Drake; Iowa Big Four	W 18–13	6–6 (5–5)	State Gymnasium; Ames, Iowa
March 4, 1915*		Iowa; CyHawk Rivalry	L 18–23	6–7	State Gymnasium (3,000); Ames, Iowa
*Non-conference game. ^{#}Rankings from AP poll. (#) Tournament seedings in parentheses. All times are in Central Time.
