= List of Lehigh Mountain Hawks men's basketball head coaches =

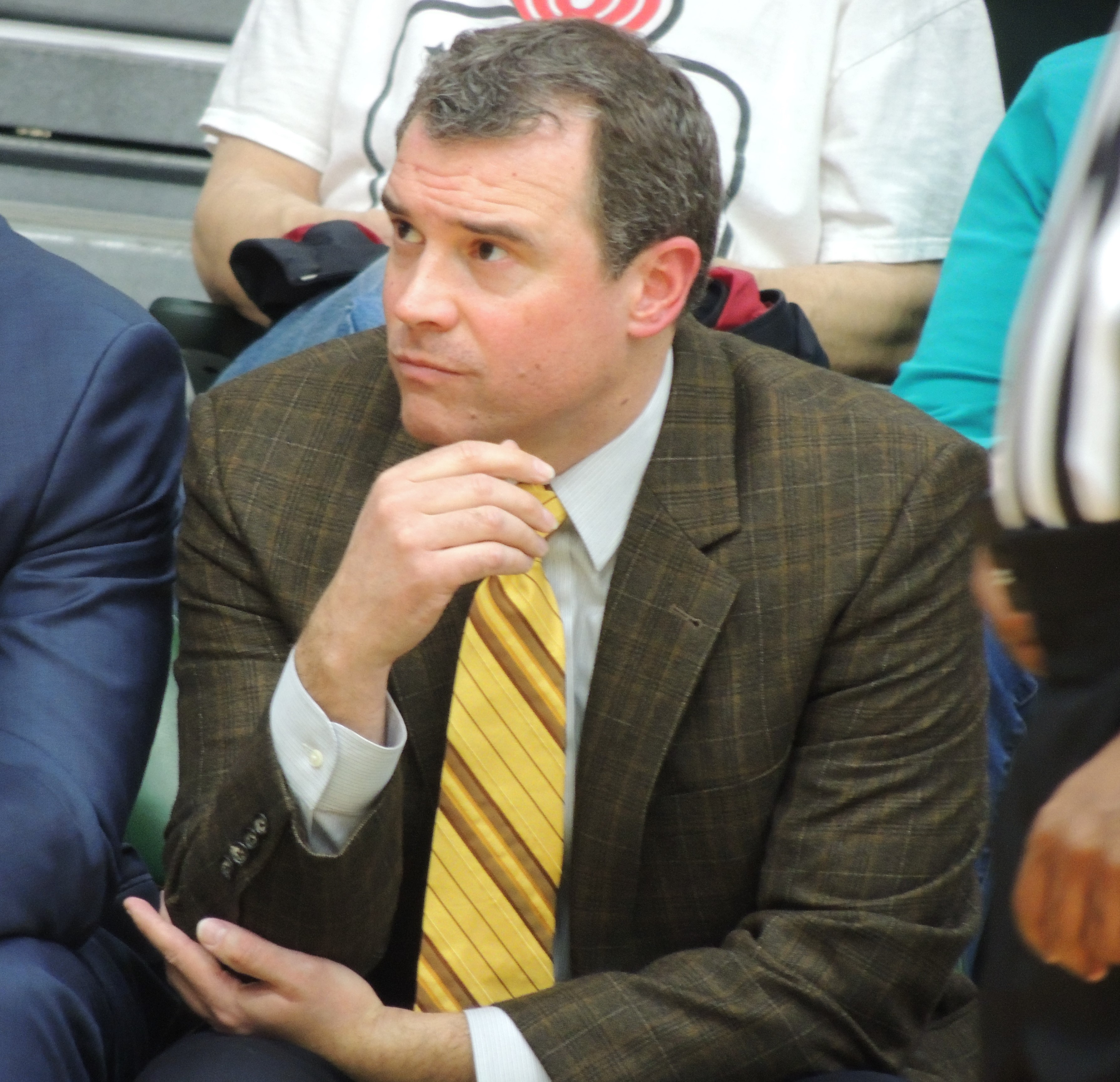
Brett Reed, the current head coach of the Lehigh Mountain Hawks, and the winningest head coach in Mountain Hawks men's basketball history.

The following is a list of Lehigh Mountain Hawks men's basketball head coaches. There have been 27 head coaches of the Mountain Hawks in their 122-season history.

Lehigh's current head coach is Brett Reed. He was hired as the Mountain Hawks' head coach in August 2007, replacing Billy Taylor, who left to become the head coach at Ball State.

No.	Tenure	Coach	Years	Record	Pct.
1	1901–1912	J. W. H. Pollard	11	67–38–1	.637
2	1912–1913	Tom Keady	1	12–2	.857
3	1913–1915	S. E. Muthart	2	21–9	.700
4	1915–1916	Harry Haring	1	12–11	.522
5	1916–1919; 1926–1932	Roy Geary	9	79–66	.545
6	1919–1921	J. Murphy	2	11–15–1	.426
7	1921–1922	Ray Fisher	1	7–9	.438
8	1922–1925	James A. Baldwin	3	33–16	.673
9	1925–1926	Charles Lingro	1	13–1	.929
10	1932–1934	Fay Bartlett	2	14–16	.467
11	1934–1937	Glen Harmeson	3	14–27	.341
12	1937–1941	Paul R. Calvert	4	27–35	.435
13	1941–1942	Marty Westerman	1	7–8	.467
14	1942–1943	James Gordon	1	5–10	.333
15	1943–1946	Leo Prendergast	3	9–39	.188
16	1946–1950	Dan Yarbro	4	18–54	.250
17	1950–1966	Tony Packer	16	112–213	.345
18	1966–1967	Pete Carril	1	11–12	.478
19	1967–1972	Roy Heckman	5	52–72	.419
20	1972–1975	Tom Pugliese	3	12–61	.164
21	1975–1983	Brian Hill	8	75–131	.364
22	1983–1985	Tom Schneider	2	16–42	.276
23	1985–1988	Fran McCaffrey	3	49–39	.557
24	1988–1996	Dave Duke	8	90–134	.402
25	1996–2002	Sal Mentesana	6	43–125	.256
26	2002–2007 (Note: Lehigh forfeited 13 wins from the 2004–05 season. Taylor's on-court record is 81–69 (.540).)	Billy Taylor	5	68–82	.453
27	2007–present	Brett Reed	16	262–222	.541
Totals		27 coaches	122 seasons	1,140–1,489–2	.434
Records updated through end of 2022–23 season Source
