= Roy Geary =

Roy Geary may refer to:

- Roy Geary (basketball) (1892–1952), American basketball player and coach
- Roy Geary (Prison Break), a Prison Break character
- Roy C. Geary (1896–1983), Irish statistician
