= List of Oregon State Beavers men's basketball head coaches =

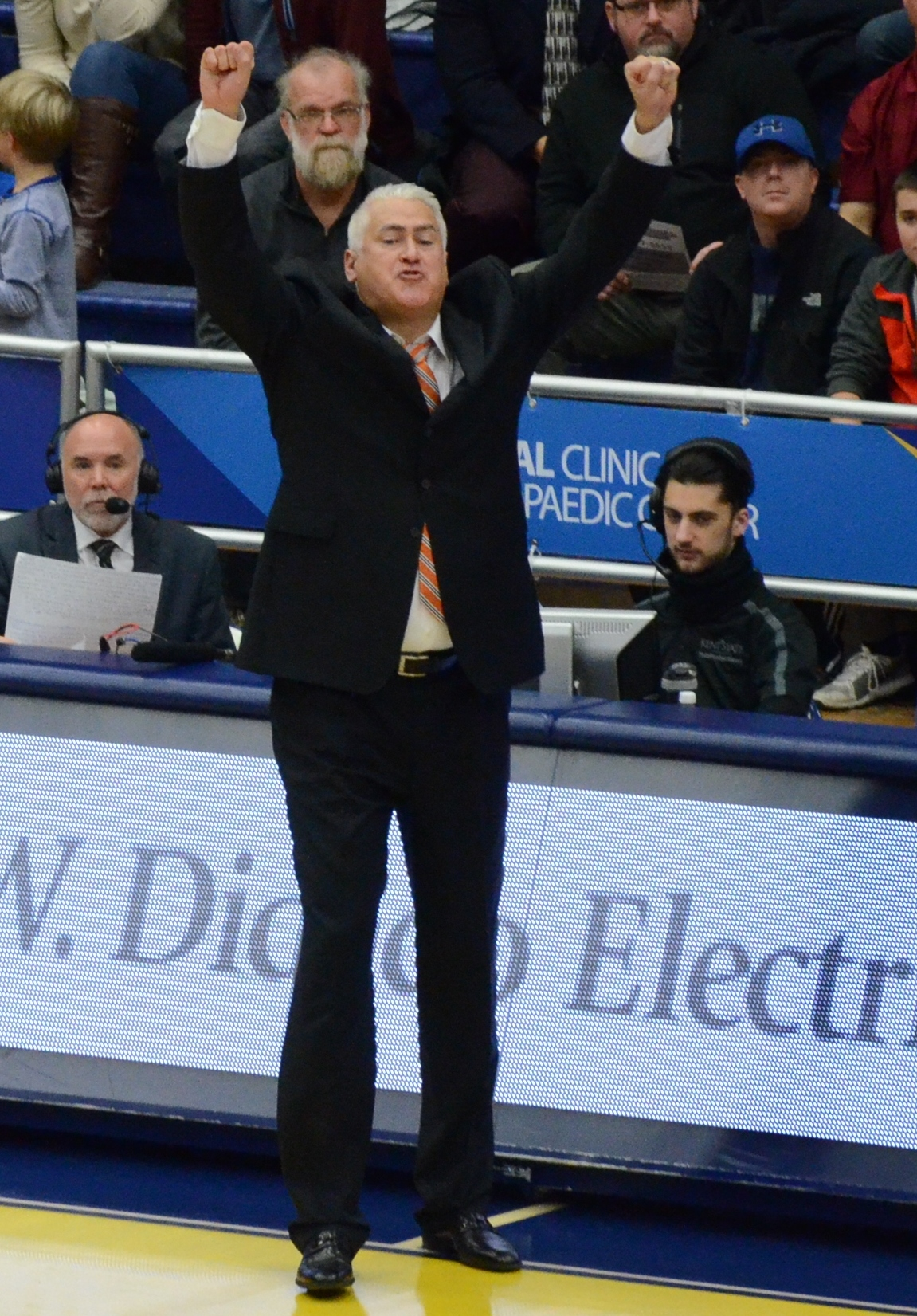
Wayne Tinkle, the current head coach of the Oregon State Beavers

Slats Gill, the winningest head coach in Beavers men's basketball history

The following is a list of Oregon State Beavers men's basketball head coaches. There have been 22 head coaches of the Beavers in their 122-season history.

Oregon State's current head coach is Wayne Tinkle. He was hired in May 2014, replacing Craig Robinson, who was fired after the 2013–14 season.

No.	Tenure	Coach	Years	Record	Pct.
1	1901–1902	J. B. Patterson	1	1–2	.333
2	1902–1903	J. W. Viggers	1	5–1	.833
3	1903–1907	W. O. Trine	4	39–7	.848
4	1907–1908	Roy Heater	1	7–4	.636
5	1908–1910	E. D. Angell	2	19–8	.704
6	1910–1911	Clifford Reed	1	3–5	.375
7	1911–1916	E. J. Stewart	5	67–33	.670
8	1916–1917	Everett May	1	11–7	.611
9	1917–1918	Howard Ray	1	15–0	1.000
10	1918–1920	Homer Woodson Hargiss	2	10–25	.286
11	1920–1922	Dick Rutherford	2	27–19	.587
12	1922–1928	Robert Hager	6	115–53	.685
13	1928–1964 (Note: Gill was sick for 12 games during the 1959–60 season. Paul Valenti served as interim coach for these games.)	Slats Gill	36	599–392	.604
14	1960*; 1964–1970	Paul Valenti	7	91–82	.526
15	1970–1989 (Note: Oregon State forfeited 15 wins from the 1975–76 season, and vacated five NCAA tournament games between 1980 and 1982. Miller's on-court record is 359–186 (.659).)	Ralph Miller	19	342–198	.633
16	1989–1995	Jim Anderson	6	79–90	.467
17	1995–2000	Eddie Payne	5	52–88	.371
18	2000–2002	Ritchie McKay	2	22–37	.373
19	2002–2008 (Note: John was fired in January 2008. Kevin Mouton served as interim head coach for the remainder of the 2007–08 season.)	Jay John	6	72–97	.426
20	2008*	Kevin Mouton	1	0–13	.000
21	2008–2014	Craig Robinson	6	94–105	.472
22	2014–present	Wayne Tinkle	12	176–204	.463
Totals		22 coaches	122 seasons	1,797–1,425	.558
Records updated through end of 2022–23 season * - Denotes interim head coach. Source
