= Colliflower =

Colliflower is a surname. Notable people with the surname include:

- George Colliflower (1886–1980), American basketball player and coach
- Harry Colliflower (1869–1961), American baseball pitcher

== See also ==
- Gorenflo
