= Fred Williams (basketball, born 1896) =

American basketball player

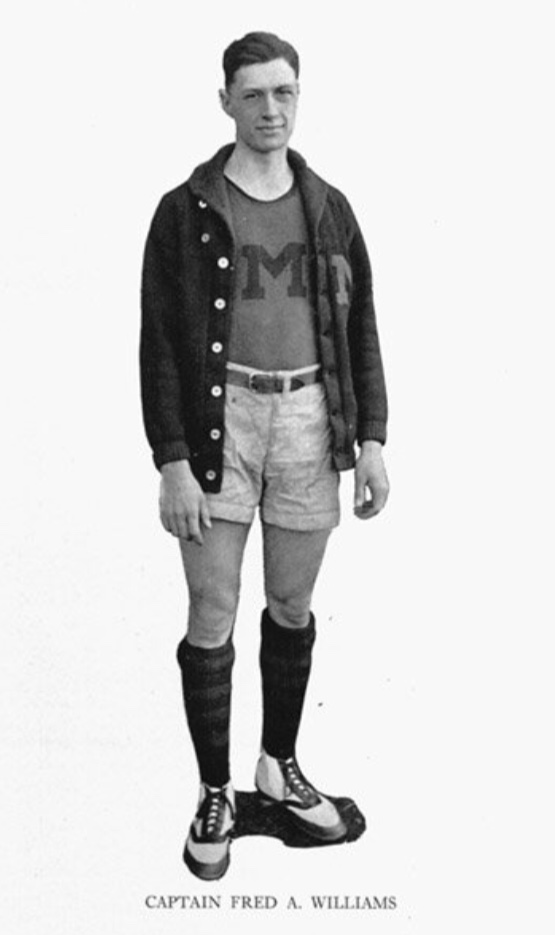
- Williams from the 1917 Savitar

Personal information
- Born: July 28, 1896 Kansas City, Missouri, U.S.
- Died: February 27, 1937 (aged 40) Excelsior Springs, Missouri, U.S.

Career information
- College: Missouri (1914–1917)
- Position: Center

Career highlights
- Helms Foundation All-American (1916); AAU champion (1922)

Fred M. Williams (July 28, 1896 – February 27, 1937) was an All-American college basketball player for the University of Missouri. He was the older brother of George Williams, who was also an All-American at Missouri.

A center from Kansas City, Missouri, Williams played three seasons at Missouri under coaches Eugene Van Gent and John Miller. In his junior season of 1915–16, Williams emerged as the team's leader, pacing the Tigers to a 12–3 record and becoming the program's first All-American and was called "undoubtedly the best individual player in the Missouri Valley Conference, if not the west" by league beat writers. The next season, Williams captained the 12–4 team to a second straight MVC runner-up finish. During his time at the university, Williams also was a member of the track team.

Following his college career, Williams managed and played for Lowe & Campbell in the Amateur Athletic Union alongside his brother George, winning the 1922 AAU championship.

Williams was killed the age of 40 in an auto collision with a transport truck near Excelsior Springs, Missouri. Williams was named to Missouri's All-Century Team in 2006.
