= Corboy =

Corboy is a surname. Notable people with the surname include:

- Edwin Corboy (1896–1950), Australian politician
- Frank Corboy (1888–1948), American coach and college athletics administrator
- Matt Corboy (born 1973), American actor
- Michael Corboy, justice with the Supreme Court of Western Australia
- Philip H. Corboy (1924–2012), American lawyer

== See also ==
- Corboy Glebe, a townland in County Cavan, Ireland
