= Gorenflo =

Gorenflo is a Huguenot surname. Notable people with the surname include:

- Kaye Gorenflo Hearn, American judge
- Rudolf Gorenflo (1930–2017), German mathematician

== See also ==
- Colliflower
