= 1914–15 Kansas Jayhawks men's basketball team =

American college basketball season

1914–15 Kansas Jayhawks men's basketball

MVIAA Champions
- Conference: MVIAA
- Record: 16–1 (13–1 MVIAA)
- Head coach: W.O. Hamilton (6th season)
- Captain: Ray Dunmire
- Home arena: Robinson Gymnasium

The 1914–15 Kansas Jayhawks men's basketball team represented the University of Kansas during the 1914–15 college men's basketball season, their 16 season. The Jayhawks, members of the MVIAA, who coached by sixth-year coach W.O. Hamilton. The Jayhawks finished the season 16–1 and won the MVIAA Championship, their 7th conference championship. On January 13, 1915, the Jayhawks defeated Warrensburg (now known as Central Missouri) who were coached by former Jayhawk basketball player and future long-time Kansas head coach Phog Allen, in what was the second of two games Allen coached against his alma mater. Ralph Sproull was retroactively named an All-American by the Helms Foundation, making him the second Jayhawk to earn the honor.

== Roster ==
- Hilmar Appel
- Lawrence Cole
- Ray Dunmire
- Ray Folks
- Karl Kaiser
- Ephraim Sorensen
- Ralph Sproull
- Arthur Weaver

== Schedule and results ==
Date time, TV	Rank^{#}	Opponent^{#}	Result	Record	Site city, state
January 8		at Iowa State	W 29–22	1–0 (1–0)	State Gymnasium; Ames, IA
January 9		at Iowa State	W 27–23	2–0 (2–0)	State Gymnasium; Ames, IA
January 13*		Warrensburg	W 46–20	3–0	Robinson Gymnasium; Lawrence, KS
January 15*		William Jewell	W 55–21	4–0	Robinson Gymnasium; Lawrence, KS
January 22		Nebraska	W 45–17	5–0 (3–0)	Robinson Gymnasium; Lawrence, KS
January 23		Nebraska	W 30–23	6–0 (4–0)	Robinson Gymnasium; Lawrence, KS
January 28		at Kansas State; Sunflower Showdown	W 38–22	7–0 (5–0)	Nichols Hall; Manhattan, KS
January 29		at Kansas State; Sunflower Showdown	W 36–32	8–0 (6–0)	Nichols Hall; Manhattan, KS
February 6*		Washburn	W 53–28	9–0	Robinson Gymnasium; Lawrence, KS
February 10		Kansas State; Sunflower Showdown	L 18–21	9–1 (6–1)	Robinson Gymnasium; Lawrence, KS
February 11		Kansas State; Sunflower Showdown	W 39–20	10–1 (7–1)	Robinson Gymnasium; Lawrence, KS
February 19		Missouri; Border War	W 42–23	11–1 (8–1)	Robinson Gymnasium; Lawrence, KS
February 20		Missouri; Border War	W 44–19	12–1 (9–1)	Robinson Gymnasium; Lawrence, KS
February 24		at Missouri; Border War	W 33–22	13–1 (10–1)	Rothwell Gymnasium; Columbia, MO
February 25		at Missouri; Border War	W 40–26	14–1 (11–1)	Rothwell Gymnasium; Columbia MO
February 26		at Washington University (MO)	W 48–16	15–1 (12–1)	Francis Gymnasium; St. Louis, MO
February 27		at Washington University (MO)	W 39–20	16–1 (13–1)	Francis Gymnasium; St. Louis, MO
*Non-conference game. ^{#}Rankings from AP Poll. (#) Tournament seedings in parentheses.
