= 1914 NCAA Men's Basketball All-Americans =

- Awarded for: 1913–14 NCAA men's basketball season

The 1914 College Basketball All-American team, as chosen retroactively by the Helms Athletic Foundation. The player highlighted in gold was chosen as the Helms Foundation College Basketball Player of the Year retroactively in 1944.

Player	Team
Lewis Castle	Syracuse
Gil Halstead	Cornell
Carl Harper	Wisconsin
Ernest Houghton	Union (NY)
Walter Lunden	Cornell
Daniel Meenan	Columbia
Nelson Norgren	Chicago
Elmer Oliphant	Purdue
Everett Southwick	CCNY
Eugene Van Gent	Wisconsin

== See also ==
- 1913–14 NCAA men's basketball season
