= Daniel Meenan =

American basketball player and coach

Biographical details
- Born: 1893; New York City, New York, U.S.
- Died: May 14, 1950 (aged 58); New York City, New York, U.S.

Playing career
- 1912–1914: Columbia

Coaching career (HC unless noted)
- 1925–1934: Columbia

Head coaching record
- Overall: 99–70 (.586)

Accomplishments and honors

Championships
- As a player 2× Eastern Intercollegiate Basketball League champion (1912, 1914); NCAA Men's Basketball All-American (1914); As a coach 3× Eastern Intercollegiate Basketball League champion (1926, 1930, 1931)

Daniel Leo Meenan Jr. was an American basketball coach and speech pathologist who was the head men's basketball coach at Columbia University from 1925 to 1933 and the head of the Post-Laryngectomy Speech Clinic at the Columbia–Presbyterian Medical Center from 1944 to 1950.

== Basketball ==
He was a starting guard for the Columbia Lions men's basketball team from 1912 to 1914. He was a member of the Columbia squad that won the 1912 Eastern Intercollegiate Basketball League and was captain of the 1914 team that was league co-champions with Cornell. He was retroactively named a 1914 NCAA Men's Basketball All-American by the Helms Athletic Foundation.

After graduating, Meenan worked in the aircraft industry, first with the Sloan Company, then with the Standard Aero company.

In 1925, Meenan was named head coach of his alma mater. He had no professional coaching experience, but had volunteered as an assistant at Columbia and Manhattan. Meenan led Columbia to three Eastern Intercollegiate Basketball League championships (1926, 1930, 1931). He resigned in 1934 to work on Wall Street.

== Speech pathology ==
In 1943, Meenan's larynx was removed due to cancer. He learned to speak without a larynx in six months and became the head of the Post-Laryngectomy Speech Clinic at the Columbia–Presbyterian Medical Center in 1944. During World War II, he worked with veterans who had lost their vocal cords at the Veterans Administration clinic at the City College of New York. He died on May 14, 1950 of arteriosclerosis at Lenox Hill Hospital.
