= 1914–15 North Carolina Tar Heels men's basketball team =

American college basketball season

1914–15 North Carolina Tar Heels men's basketball
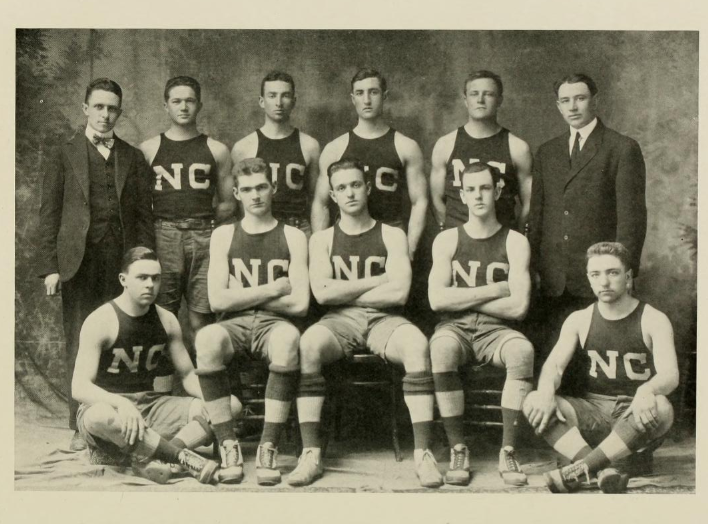
- Conference: Independent
- Record: 6–10
- Head coach: Charles Doak (1st season)
- Captain: Meb Long
- Home arena: Bynum Gymnasium

The 1914–15 North Carolina Tar Heels men's basketball team (variously "North Carolina", "Carolina" or "Tar Heels") was the fifth varsity college basketball team to represent the University of North Carolina. (Note: The school was known as the University of North Carolina until February 1963.)

== Roster and schedule ==
1914–15 North Carolina Tar Heels roster
Name	Position
Ezra Andrews	G
Rusty Davis	G
William Fuller	
Clem Holding	C
Roy Homewood	G
John Johnson	F
Ed Keesler	F
Meb Long	F
George Loughran	
Raby Tennent	G
George Tandy	C

Schedule
Date time, TV	Opponent	Result	Record	Site city, state
Regular season
December 12, 1914*	Durham Y.M.C.A.	L 14–22	0–1	Bynum Gymnasium; Chapel Hill, North Carolina
December 16, 1914*	at Durham Y.M.C.A.	L 25–44	0–2	Durham, North Carolina
December 19, 1914*	Durham Y.M.C.A.	W 25–24	1–2	Bynum Gymnasium; Chapel Hill, North Carolina
January 11, 1915*	Elon College	W 15–9	2–2	Bynum Gymnasium; Chapel Hill, North Carolina
January 16, 1915*	vs. Wake Forest	L 23–26	2–3	Raleigh, North Carolina
February 2, 1915*	Wake Forest	W 32–20	3–3	Bynum Gymnasium; Chapel Hill, North Carolina
February 8, 1915*	vs. Virginia	L 29–30 ^{OT}	3–4	Raleigh, North Carolina
February 11, 1915*	at Wake Forest	L 25–30	3–5	Wake Forest, North Carolina
February 13, 1915*	vs. Guilford College	W 45–27	4–5	Raleigh, North Carolina
February 15, 1915*	at Roanoke College	W 18–17	5–5	
February 16, 1915*	vs. Washington and Lee	L 22–29	5–6	Raleigh, North Carolina
February 17, 1915*	Virginia Military Institute	L 24–28	5–7	Bynum Gymnasium; Chapel Hill, North Carolina
February 18, 1915*	vs. Virginia	L 26–43	5–8	Fayerweather Gymnasium; Charlottesville, Virginia
February 19, 1915*	at Staunton Military Academy	W 28–16	6–8	Staunton, Virginia
February 20, 1915*	at Lynchburg Y.M.C.A.	L 20–63	6–9	
February 27, 1915*	at Elon College	L 15–19	6–10	
*Non-conference game. ^{#}Rankings from AP Poll. (#) Tournament seedings in parentheses. All times are in Eastern Time.
