= Eugene Van Gent =

American athlete and coach (1889–1949)

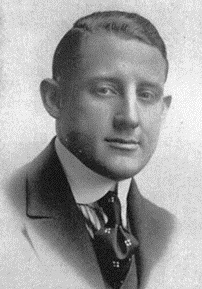
- Van Gent from The Savitar, 1916

Biographical details
- Born: December 23, 1889; Ottumwa, Iowa, U.S.
- Died: June 12, 1949 (aged 59); Solano County, California, U.S.

Playing career

Football
- 1911: Wisconsin
- 1913: Wisconsin

Basketball
- 1911–1914: Wisconsin

Coaching career (HC unless noted)

Football
- 1916: Texas
- 1919: Texas (assistant)
- 1920: University Farm
- 1921: Stanford

Basketball
- 1914–1916: Missouri
- 1916–1917: Texas
- 1921–1922: Stanford

Head coaching record
- Overall: 14–8–3 (football); 42–19 (basketball)

Accomplishments and honors

Championships
- Football; SWC (1916)

Awards
- Basketball; All-American (1914)

Conrad Eugene Van Gent (December 23, 1889 – June 12, 1949) was an American college football and college basketball player and coach. He served as the head football at the University of Texas at Austin in 1916, the University Farm—now known as the University of California, Davis—in 1920, and Stanford University in 1921, compiling a career college football head coaching record of 14–8–3. Van Gent was also the head basketball coach at the University of Missouri (1914–1916), Texas (1916–1917), and Stanford (1921–1922), tallying a career college basketball head coaching mark of 42–19. Van Gent played football and basketball, and ran track at the University of Wisconsin–Madison. He was selected to the College Basketball All-American team in 1914.

== Coaching career ==
During his two seasons as basketball head coach at the University of Missouri, from 1914 to 1916, Van Gent led to the Tigers to a 21–9 overall record. The University of Texas hired Van Gent as both football and basketball head coach in 1916. He coached for one season in each sport before joining the military to fight in the World War I. In the 1916 college football season, Van Gent directed Texas to a 7–2 overall record in football and a 6–1 record in Southwest Conference play. As men's basketball head coach for the 1916–17 season, he directed the Longhorns to a 13–3 overall record (7–1 in conference play) and their third consecutive Southwest Conference championship. In 1921, Van Gent coached the Stanford Cardinal football team, compiling a 4–2–2 record. Van Gent also coached Stanford's basketball team in 1921–22. He fell ill with encephalitis lethargica in December 1922 and was hospitalized in San Francisco.

== Head coaching record ==
=== Football ===
Year	Team	Overall	Conference	Standing	Bowl/playoffs
Texas Longhorns (Southwest Conference) (1916)
1916	Texas	7–2	6–1	1st	
Texas:		7–2	6–1		
University Farm (Independent) (1920)
1920	University Farm	3–4–1			
University Farm:		3–4–1			
Stanford (Pacific Coast Conference) (1921)
1921	Stanford	4–2–2	1–1–1	3rd	
Stanford:		4–2–2	1–1–1		
Total:		14–8–3			
National championship Conference title Conference division title or championship game berth

== Basketball ==
Record table
Season	Team	Overall	Conference	Standing	Postseason
Missouri Tigers (Missouri Valley Conference) (1914–1916)
1914–15	Missouri	8–6	6–6	3rd	
1915–16	Missouri	12–3	9–2	2nd	
Missouri:		21–9 (.700)	15–8 (.652)		
Texas Longhorns (Southwest Conference) (1917)
1916–17	Texas	13–3	7–1	1st	
Texas:		13–3 (.813)	7–1 (.875)		
Stanford (Pacific Coast Conference) (1921–1922)
1921–22	Stanford	8–7	4–6	5th	
Stanford:		8–7 (.533)	4–6 (.400)		
Total:		42–19 (.689)			
National champion Postseason invitational champion Conference regular season champion Conference regular season and conference tournament champion Division regular season champion Division regular season and conference tournament champion Conference tournament champion
