= 1915–16 Kansas Jayhawks men's basketball team =

American college basketball season

1915–16 Kansas Jayhawks men's basketball
- Conference: Missouri Valley Intercollegiate Athletic Association
- Record: 6-12 (5-11 MVIAA)
- Head coach: W.O. Hamilton (7th season)
- Assistant coach: Ralph Sproull (1st Season)
- Captain: Lawrence Cole
- Home arena: Robinson Gymnasium

The 1915–16 Kansas Jayhawks men's basketball team represented the University of Kansas during the 1915–16 college men's basketball season.

== Roster ==
- Hilmar Appel
- Lawrence Cole
- Leon Gibbens
- Walter Kauder
- Carl Kennedy
- Harold Lytle
- Lawrence Nelson
- Darwin Pattinson
- John Reber
- Rudolf Uhrlaub

== Schedule and results ==
Date time, TV	Rank^{#}	Opponent^{#}	Result	Record	Site city, state
January 7		Iowa State	W 26–25	1-0 (1-0)	Robinson Gymnasium; Lawrence, KS
January 8		Iowa State	L 21–24	1-1 (1-1)	Robinson Gymnasium; Lawrence, KS
January 12*		Washburn	W 38–10	2-1	Robinson Gymnasium; Lawrence, KS
January 14		at Nebraska	L 33–34	2-2 (1-2)	Grant Memorial Hall; Lincoln, NE
January 15		at Nebraska	L 27–40	2-3 (1-3)	Grant Memorial Hall; Lincoln, NE
January 20		Kansas State; Sunflower Showdown	L 18–31	2-4 (1-4)	Robinson Gymnasium; Lawrence, KS
January 24		Kansas State; Sunflower Showdown	L 12–26	2-5 (1-5)	Robinson Gymnasium; Lawrence, KS
February 4		Washington University (MO)	W 30–16	3-5 (2-5)	Robinson Gymnasium; Lawrence, KS
February 5		Washington University (MO)	W 43–13	4-5 (3-5)	Robinson Gymnasium; Lawrence, KS
February 9		at Missouri; Border War	L 24–30	4-6 (3-6)	Rothwell Gymnasium; Columbia, MO
February 10		at Missouri; Border War	L 20–42	4-7 (3-7)	Rothwell Gymnasium; Columbia, MO
February 11		at Washington University (MO)	W 30–25	5-7 (4-7)	Francis Gymnasium; St. Louis, MO
February 12		at Washington University (MO)	L 24–33	5-8 (4-8)	Francis Gymnasium; St. Louis, MO
February 17		at Kansas State; Sunflower Showdown	L 23–38	5-9 (4-9)	Nichols Hall; Manhattan, KS
February 18		at Kansas State; Sunflower Showdown	L 21–45	5-10 (4-10)	Nichols Hall; Manhattan, KS
February 24*		Emporia State	L 25–36	5-11	Robinson Gymnasium; Lawrence, KS
February 28		Missouri; Border War	L 10–41	5-12 (4-11)	Robinson Gymnasium; Lawrence, KS
February 29		Missouri; Border War	W 31–19	6-12 (5-11)	Robinson Gymnasium; Lawrence, KS
*Non-conference game. ^{#}Rankings from AP Poll. (#) Tournament seedings in parentheses.
