= Elmer Oliphant =

American athlete and coach (1892–1975)

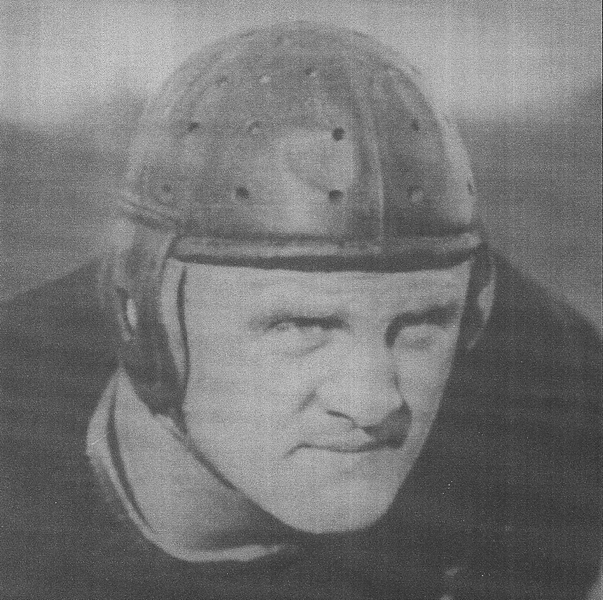

Biographical details
- Born: July 9, 1892; Bloomfield, Indiana, U.S.
- Died: July 3, 1975 (aged 82); New Canaan, Connecticut, U.S.

Playing career

Football
- 1912–1913: Purdue
- 1916–1917: Army
- 1920: Rochester Jeffersons
- 1921: Buffalo All-Americans

Basketball
- 1912–1915: Purdue
- 1915–1918: Army
- Position: Halfback (football)

Coaching career (HC unless noted)

Track
- ?: Army

Ice hockey
- 1922–1923: Union

Administrative career (AD unless noted)
- 1922–1924: Union

Accomplishments and honors

Championships
- National champion (1914)

Awards
- Helms Athletic Foundation Hall of Fame (1953); Indiana Football Hall of Fame (1975); Indiana’s Finest Amateur Athlete; Purdue Athletics Hall of Fame (1997); Kappa Sigma fraternity Hall of Fame (1997); Army Sports Hall of Fame (2004); First-team All-Pro (1921); 2× All-American (basketball) (1914, 1915); 2× All-American (football) (1916, 1917); 2× All-Western (1912, 1913); Army Athletic Association Trophy (1918); FWAA College Football All-Time Team (1869–1919); Yost All-time All-America Team
- College Football Hall of Fame; Inducted in 1955 (profile)

Elmer Quillen Oliphant (July 9, 1892 – July 3, 1975), nicknamed "Catchy" or "Ollie", was an American football, basketball and track player and coach. He is one of the great scorers in college football history, credited with a total of 435 points in his college career, 135 at Purdue and 300 at Army. Oliphant also went on to play in the National Football League (NFL).

== Early years ==
Oliphant was born in Bloomfield, Indiana to Marion Elsworth Oliphant and Alice V. Quillen Oliphant in 1892. He began school in Bloomfield but the family moved to Washington, Indiana when he was eight or nine. Elmer Oliphant transferred to Linton High School from Washington High School during his junior year. His father's gristmill partner had absconded with $62,000 in company funds. The family moved back to the Linton area and he worked part-time in the coal mines to help with family finances. Although the teams weren't called “The Miners” when he graduated from Linton in 1910; he was a real Linton Miner.

Oliphant was nicknamed Catchy. That may be because he excelled as a catcher, outfielder and power hitter in baseball. It could also be because the dictionary has one meaning of catchy as “having the power to catch the attention.” Supposedly one time he was playing center field for the Linton team, called a time-out, hurried to the nearby cinder track and won the 100-yard dash. Then, he returned to his position in center field and the game continued. The Indiana Football Hall of Fame states that he was All-State End while at Linton High School. He scored a school record of 60 points as Linton defeated rival Sullivan by a whopping 128–0 score.

Oliphant was captain of the track team and led the team to the State Championship for 1909–10. That trophy won May 21, 1910 and the Big Four Meet trophy won May 14, 1910 are still in the trophy case in the commons with Oliphant's name engraved on them. Members of the team wore a diamond shape with a large “L” in the center on their shirts and that picture is also on display.

The track and football field area at Linton-Stockton High School was called Oliphant Field from at least the date the school was occupied in 1922 (and perhaps as early as 1918) until 1980. He was selected as Indiana's Finest Amateur Athlete by the Helms Foundation in 1958 and was selected for the FWAA Early-Day All-Time All-America Team in 1969. His picture once hung in the Linton-Stockton High School gym and from 1918 (or at least 1922) until 1980, In 2006, plaques were placed in the gym foyer representing those who are in the Indiana Football Hall of Fame from Linton, so his name is once again prominently displayed in the town of Linton, Indiana.

== Purdue ==
He entered Purdue University, but not on a scholarship. Instead, he waited tables, carried laundry, stoked furnaces, and sold shoes to earn his way. He continued to develop strength and toughness by working as a coal miner during his summer vacations. He earned seven varsity letters in football, basketball, baseball and track. He also swam and wrestled. An end on the football team as a freshman, he was a starting halfback for his final three seasons at the school and distinguished himself as a runner and kicker. Only 5’7” and 174 pounds, he belied his build with outstanding speed and power. In football, he helped turn Purdue's football into a winning program. He graduated with a degree in mechanical engineering, and was a member of Kappa Sigma fraternity, Chi chapter of Purdue.

An excellent student (and perhaps to extend his time in football), he received an appointment to the U.S. Military Academy at West Point upon his graduation.

== West Point ==
At West Point, he was the first cadet athlete to letter in four major sports and it required a special act of the Athletic Council to design a suitable varsity letter containing a gold star and three stripes for him. Back at the turn of the 20th century, the criteria to receive a letter was very strict. He also monogrammed in hockey, boxing, and swimming which meant that he wasn't able to participate fully in those sports but was recognized. At that, he is listed as a Champion Boxer in the Corps of Cadets.

He still holds records that have never been broken. He has the individual record for scoring in a single football game at Purdue which was for 43 points in 1912. At West Point he is the season leader with 125 points in 1917 and holds an individual record for scoring with 45 points in 1916. During his college career, he scored 135 points at Purdue and 289 points at West Point and is identified as one of the greatest scorers in collegiate history. He established the World Record in 220-yard low hurdles on grass.

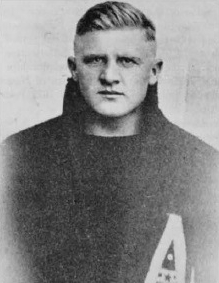
Oliphant in Army letterman's jacket

While at West Point he won the Army Athletic Association Trophy. (He won in 1918. 2004 was the 100th year the trophy was given.) He also won the Edgerton Saber as football captain and the Army Athletic Association Saber as the outstanding athlete. Forty-four years after he left Indiana, the Helms Foundation asked sports writers and experts to select Indiana's Finest Amateur Athlete and Oliphant was selected. In 1969, which was the 100th anniversary of the game, the Football Writers Association of America came up with two 11 man teams. The FWAA Early-Day All-Time All-America Team (1869 to 1919) includes Oliphant. He was the only member of that team still living and attended the ceremony. One team represented the first 50 years and the second-team represented the next.

He has been inducted into several Halls of Fame. The most recent induction occurred on October 6, 2004. He was in the inaugural group of sixteen inducted into the Army Sports Hall of Fame at West Point. A color copy of the plaque is on display in the commons at Linton-Stockton High School. The base of the plaque is black with a shape that has forms taken from castle architecture such as crenellation. This is perhaps to tie in the plaque to the team name which is “The Black Knights”. In 2006, of the 4.5 million who have played college football in the 138-year history of the game, only 813 players had been inducted into the College Football Hall of Fame.

On graduation day, June 12, 1918, he married Barbara "Bobbie" Benedict. World War I changed priorities at West Point, and they reverted to purely military instruction during wartime. Among his duties, he served in the U.S. Cavalry for one year at Fort Sill in Oklahoma. While in military service at West Point in 1919, he invented the intramural sports system as we know it today. The idea was copied by the Naval Academy and was soon used in colleges and universities across the country. He was appointed track instructor at West Point by Douglas MacArthur, who was the superintendent after returning from World War I. MacArthur later was Supreme Allied Commander of the Southwest Pacific Theater of Operations (term used for all military activity in that area) during World War II and accepted the surrender of Japan in September 1945. Oliphant knew many generals, including General Lucius Clay, “Father of the Berlin Air Lift”, who roomed across the hall from him at West Point and General Dwight David Eisenhower who corresponded with him, calling him “Ollie”, which was his college nickname.

Although he is virtually forgotten today, he was known to every sports fan in the first quarter of the 20th century. There is a 1955 Topps All-American collectible sports card with his picture, and a Street and Smith comic book featured him in 1943 with a section “The Thrilling Story of West Point’s Most Famous Athlete Four Letter Man, Ollie Oliphant.” A board game that featured a picture of him inside a football shape on the cover is dated from 1933. It is titled "Oliphant Football Game" and was produced by The Coaches Game Inc. of New York City. In the 100 Greatest Players of All Time (in an article that thanks the College Football Hall of Fame for their help), he is #78. His name is mentioned in two well-known films, The Long Gray Line (1955) and Knute Rockne, All American (1940).

== Professional football ==
Oliphant played for the Rochester Jeffersons in 1920 and the Buffalo All-Americans in 1921. They were some of the first members of what is now the NFL (National Football League). In 1921, Oliphant led the league in points (47), FGs (5) and PATs (26) and threw 7 touchdowns for the Buffalo All-Americans. After the 1921 season, Oliphant retired from active participation in sports.

== Admin and coaching ==
He was the athletic director at Union College in Schenectady, New York for two years. He was appointed track coach at West Point. Oliphant was also AAU coach and helped prepare the Americans for the 1924 Olympics in Paris.

== Insurance ==
In 1925, Oliphant joined the Metropolitan Life Insurance Company. He retired in 1957 and died in 1975.

== Head coaching record ==
=== Ice hockey ===
Record table
Season	Team	Overall	Conference	Standing	Postseason
Union Skating Dutchmen Independent (1922–1923)
1922–23	Union	2–1–0			
Union:		2–1–0			
Total:		2–1–0			
