= Gary Mattocks =

American football player and coach (born 1931)

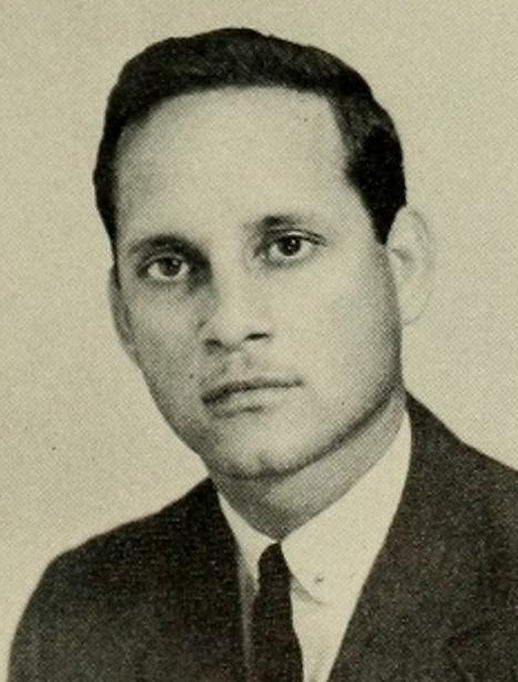
- Mattocks pictured in Phi Psi Cli 1961, Elon yearbook

Biographical details
- Born: February 23, 1931 (age 95); Jonesboro, Lee County, North Carolina, U.S.

Playing career
- 1954–1956: East Carolina
- Positions: Quarterback, halfback

Coaching career (HC unless noted)
- c. 1958: Hamlet HS (NC)
- 1959: East Carolina (freshmen)
- 1960–1964: Elon (assistant)
- 1965–1966: Elon

Head coaching record
- Overall: 3–17 (college)

Gary Bizzette Mattocks (born February 23, 1931) is an American former football coach. He served as the head football coach at Elon University from 1965 to 1966, compiling a record of 3–17.

An alumnus of East Carolina University, Mattocks was later employed by the Central Intelligence Agency (CIA). He lives in Southern Pines, North Carolina.

== Head coaching record ==
=== College ===
Year	Team	Overall	Conference	Standing	Bowl/playoffs
Elon Fightin' Christians (Carolinas Conference) (1965–1966)
1965	Elon	2–8	0–7	8th	
1966	Elon	1–9	1–6	8th	
Elon:		3–17	1–13		
Total:		3–17			
