= 1915–16 Wisconsin Badgers men's basketball team =

American college basketball season

1915–16 Wisconsin Badgers men's basketball

Helms Foundation National Champions Western Conference Champions
- Conference: Big Ten Conference
- Record: 20–1 (11–1 Big Ten)
- Head coach: Walter Meanwell
- Home arena: Red Gym

1915–16 Western Conference men's basketball standings
	Conf.				Overall
Team	W		L	PCT	W		L	PCT
Wisconsin	11	–	1	.917	20	–	1	.952
Illinois	9	–	3	.750	13	–	3	.813
Northwestern	9	–	3	.750	13	–	3	.813
Minnesota	6	–	6	.500	11	–	6	.647
Indiana	3	–	5	.375	6	–	7	.462
Chicago	4	–	8	.333	15	–	11	.577
Iowa	2	–	4	.333	11	–	4	.733
Ohio State	2	–	8	.200	9	–	13	.409
Purdue	2	–	10	.167	4	–	10	.286

The 1915–16 Wisconsin Badgers men's basketball team represented University of Wisconsin–Madison. The head coach was Walter Meanwell, coaching his fifth season with the Badgers. The team played their home games at the Red Gym in Madison, Wisconsin and was a member of the Western Conference. The team finished the season with a 20–1 record won the Western Conference. The team was retroactively named the national champion by the Helms Athletic Foundation and was retroactively listed as the top team of the season by the Premo-Porretta Power Poll.

== Schedule ==
Date time, TV	Rank^{#}	Opponent^{#}	Result	Record	Site city, state
Regular Season
12/10/1915*		Beloit (WI)	W 38–11	1–0	Red Gym; Madison, WI
12/15/1915*		Lawrence (WI)	W 46–16	2–0	Red Gym; Madison, WI
12/30/1915*		at Ripon (WI)	W 27–15	3–0	Ripon, WI
12/30/1915*		at Ripon (WI) Reserves	W 41–7	4–0	Ripon, WI
12/31/1915*		at Milwaukee Normals	W 51–12	5–0	Milwaukee, WI
1/01/1916*		at Milwaukee Normals Alumni	W 24–18	6–0	Milwaukee, WI
1/01/1916*		at Milwaukee Normals	W 39–8	7–0	Milwaukee, WI
1/03/1916*		Wabash (IN)	W 24–14	8–0	Red Gym; Madison, WI
1/08/1916		at Purdue	W 33–17	9–0 (1–0)	Memorial Gymnasium; West Lafayette, IN
1/10/1916		at Iowa	W 36–31 ^{OT}	10–0 (2–0)	Iowa Armory; Iowa City, IA
1/15/1916		Minnesota	W 31–11	11–0 (3–0)	Red Gym; Madison, WI
1/18/1916		Northwestern	W 22–18	12–0 (4–0)	Red Gym; Madison, WI
1/22/1916		at Illinois	L 20–27	12–1 (4–1)	Kenney Gym; Urbana, IL
1/29/1916		at Chicago	W 29–18	13–1 (5–1)	Bartlett Gymnasium; Chicago, IL
2/14/1916*		Nebraska Wesleyan	W 25–20	14–1	Red Gym; Madison, WI
2/19/1916		Illinois	W 34–14	15–1 (6–1)	Red Gym; Madison, WI
2/25/1916		Purdue	W 35–22	16–1 (7–1)	Red Gym; Madison, WI
2/28/1916		Iowa	W 39–17	17–1 (8–1)	Red Gym; Madison, WI
3/04/1916		at Minnesota	W 32–14	18–1 (9–1)	Minnesota Armory; Minneapolis, MN
3/08/1916		Chicago	W 24–12	19–1 (10–1)	Red Gym; Madison, WI
3/11/1916		at Northwestern	W 24–21	20–1 (11–1)	Patten Gymnasium; Evanston, IL
*Non-conference game. ^{#}Rankings from AP Poll. (#) Tournament seedings in parentheses.
