= Ernest Houghton =

American basketball player and coach (1893–1941)

Personal information
- Born: October 10, 1893
- Died: July 24, 1941 (aged 47) Brighton, New York, U.S.

Career information
- College: Union (NY) (1912–1915)
- Position: Guard

Career history

Playing
- 1915–1916: Kingston
- 1916–1917: Hudson
- 1917–1918: Gloversville
- 1919–1920: Rochester Kodaks

Coaching
- 1915–1917: Peddie School
- 1917–1918: The Albany Academy
- 1917–1918: Union (NY) (assistant)

Career highlights
- Helms National Player of the Year (1915); 2× Helms All-American (1914, 1915)

Ernest Baker Houghton (October 10, 1893 – July 24, 1941) was an American college basketball standout at Union College in the 1910s. He was a Helms Athletic Foundation All-American in both 1914 and 1915, and was named their National Player of the Year after the 1914–15 season. He also played football and baseball at Union.

After college, Houghton played in one of the earliest professional basketball leagues in the United States – the New York State League. He played for Hudson and was a high scoring player, but the league was disrupted and ultimately folded due to World War I. In 23 games, Houghton scored 100 career points. Houghton coached high school basketball at the Peddie School in New Jersey and high school basketball and football at The Albany Academy in New York. He also served as an assistant coach to Union College's men's basketball team, while his day job was selling life insurance.

Houghton died in his home in Brighton, New York at age 48, caused by heart seizures.
