= 1914–15 University of Virginia men's basketball team =

American college basketball season

1914–15 University of Virginia men's basketball
- Conference: South Atlantic Intercollegiate Athletic Association
- Record: 17–0 (5–0 SAIAA)
- Head coach: Henry Lannigan
- Home arena: Fayerweather Gymnasium

The 1914–15 University of Virginia men's basketball team represented the University of Virginia during the 1914–15 NCAA men's basketball season. The team was led by tenth-year head coach Henry Lannigan, and played their home games at Fayerweather Gymnasium in Charlottesville, Virginia. This season is notable as the only undefeated season in program history, as well as including the first basketball game with long-time rival Virginia Tech. Now known as the Virginia Cavaliers, the team did not have an official nickname prior to 1923.

== Schedule ==
Date time, TV	Opponent	Result	Record	Site city, state
Regular season
January 11* no, no	George Washington	W 41–12	1–0	Fayerweather Gymnasium; Charlottesville, VA
January 13* no, no	Jefferson School	W 44–11	2–0	Fayerweather Gymnasium; Charlottesville, VA
January 16* no, no	West Virginia Wesleyan	W 56–25	3–0	Fayerweather Gymnasium; Charlottesville, VA
January 18* no, no	Randolph–Macon	W 72–19	4–0	Fayerweather Gymnasium; Charlottesville, VA
January 20 no, no	Richmon	W 39–13	5–0 (1–0)	Fayerweather Gymnasium; Charlottesville, VA
January 23* no, no	vs. VMI	W 40–16	6–0 (1–0)	Fayerweather Gymnasium; Charlottesville, VA
January 26* no, no	Roanoke	W 55–14	7–0 (1–0)	Fayerweather Gymnasium; Charlottesville, VA
January 30* no, no	Catholic	W 34–21	8–0 (1–0)	Fayerweather Gymnasium; Charlottesville, VA
February 1* no, no	Duke	W 52–14	9–0 (1–0)	Fayerweather Gymnasium; Charlottesville, VA
February 6* no, no	vs. Washington and Lee	W 28–13	10–0 (1–0)	Fayerweather Gymnasium; Charlottesville, VA
February 8 no, no	vs. North Carolina	W 30–29 ^{OT}	11–0 (2–0)	Fayerweather Gymnasium; Charlottesville, VA
February 9* no, no	vs. Duke	W 51–24	12–0 (2–0)	Fayerweather Gymnasium; Charlottesville, VA
February 13* no, no	Loyola	W 48–26	13–0 (2–0)	Fayerweather Gymnasium; Charlottesville, VA
February 18 no, no	North Carolina	W 43–26	14–0 (3–0)	Fayerweather Gymnasium; Charlottesville, VA
February 20 no, no	Virginia Tech; Virginia–Virginia Tech rivalry	W 39–21	15–0 (4–0)	Fayerweather Gymnasium; Charlottesville, VA
February 25* no, no	at Catholic	W 29–28	16–0 (4–0)	Washington, DC
February 26 no, no	at George Washington	W 27–19	17–0 (5–0)	Washington, DC
*Non-conference game. (#) Tournament seedings in parentheses. All times are in Eastern Time.
