= Hap Perry =

American football, basketball, and baseball coach

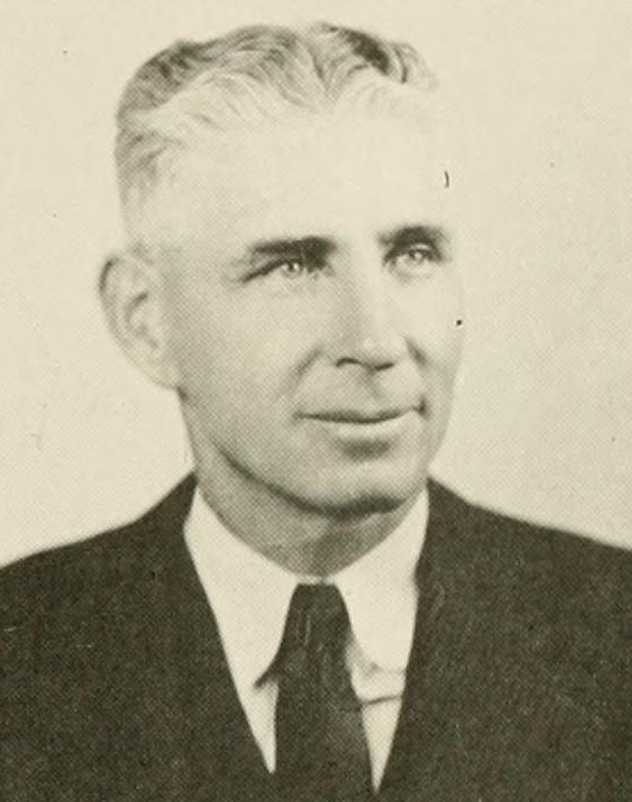
- Perry pictured in Phi Psi Cli 1947, Elon yearbook

Biographical details
- Born: March 30, 1896; Ansonville, North Carolina, U.S.
- Died: January 24, 1986 (aged 89); Hillsborough County, Florida, U.S.
- Education: Elon University (1923)

Coaching career (HC unless noted)

Football
- 1946–1947: Elon

Basketball
- 1946–1947: Elon

Baseball
- 1947: Elon

Head coaching record
- Overall: 8–11–1 (football); 16–10 (basketball); 14–10 (baseball)

Lindsay Jackson "Happy" Perry Sr. (March 30, 1896 – January 24, 1986) was an American football, basketball, and baseball coach. He served as the head football coach at Elon University from 1946 to 1947, compiling a record of 8–11–1. He graduated from Elon in 1923, with a Bachelor of Arts degree. His hometown was Wingate, North Carolina.

== Head coaching record ==
=== Football ===
Year	Team	Overall	Conference	Standing	Bowl/playoffs
Elon Fightin' Christians (North State Conference) (1946–1947)
1946	Elon	4–5–1	1–4–1	7th	
1947	Elon	4–6	2–5	7th	
Elon:		8–11–1	3–9–1		
Total:		8–11–1			
