= 1915–16 Tennessee Volunteers basketball team =

American college basketball season

1915–16 Tennessee Volunteers basketball

SIAA champion
- Conference: Southern Intercollegiate Athletic Association
- Record: 12–0 (2–0 SIAA)
- Head coach: Zora Clevenger (5th season)
- Captain: B. J. Greenwood
- Home arena: none

The 1915–16 Tennessee Volunteers basketball team represented the University of Tennessee during the 1915–16 college men's basketball season. The head coach was Zora Clevenger, coaching the team in his fifth season. The Volunteers team captain was B.J. Greenwood.

== Schedule ==
Date time, TV	Opponent	Result	Record	Site city, state
January 8, 1916*	Johnson Bible College	W 43–20	1–0	Knoxville, TN
January 14, 1916*	at Chattanooga	W 39–22	2–0	Chattanooga, TN
January 22, 1916*	Cumberland College	W 54–25	3–0	Knoxville, TN
January 29, 1916*	Chattanooga	W 31–22	4–0	Knoxville, TN
February 5, 1916*	Murphy College	W 43–16	5–0	Knoxville, TN
February 11, 1916*	at Murphy College	W 34–20	6–0	Sevierville, TN
February 19, 1916*	Emory & Henry	W 27–19	7–0	Knoxville, TN
February 22, 1915*	at Cumberland College	W 63–33	8–0	Williamsburg, KY
February 23, 1916*	at Kentucky	W 28–17	9–0	State College Gymnasium; Lexington, KY
February 24, 1916*	at Louisville	W 25–20	10–0	Louisville, KY
February 25, 1916*	at Centre	W 39–30	11–0	Danville, KY
February 26, 1916*	at Transylvania	W 32–30	12–0	Lexington, KY
*Non-conference game. (#) Tournament seedings in parentheses.
