= Horace Hendrickson =

American athlete, coach, and administrator (1910–2004)

- Hendrickson pictured in The Agromeck 1953, NC State yearbook

Biographical details
- Born: August 24, 1910; Delphos, Ohio, U.S.
- Died: May 22, 2004 (aged 93); Raleigh, North Carolina, U.S.

Playing career

Football
- 1933: Duke

Basketball
- 1933–1934: Duke

Baseball
- 1932–1934: Duke
- Position: Quarterback

Coaching career (HC unless noted)

Football
- 1934–1936: Duke (assistant freshmen)
- 1937–1941: Elon
- 1942–1947: Penn (backfield)
- 1948: Brooklyn Dodgers (backfield)
- 1949–1950: Duke (freshmen)
- 1951: NC State (backfield)
- 1952–1953: NC State

Basketball
- 1937–1942: Elon

Baseball
- 1938–1941: Elon
- 1944–1948: Penn

Administrative career (AD unless noted)
- 1937–1942: Elon

Head coaching record
- Overall: 35–28–1 (football); 95–21 (basketball); 109–56–1 (baseball)

Accomplishments and honors

Championships
- Football; 2 North State (1938, 1941)

Awards
- First-team All-SoCon (1933)

Horace James "Horse" Hendrickson (August 24, 1910 – May 22, 2004) was an American football, basketball and baseball player, coach, and college athletics administrator. He served as the head football coach at Elon University from 1937 to 1941 and at North Carolina State University from 1952 to 1953, compiling a career college football record of 35–28–1. From 1937 to 1941, Hendrickson coached at Elon University, where he compiled a 31–12–1 record. His best season came in 1941, when his team went 8–1. For much of the 1940s, he was an assistant coach at the University of Pennsylvania. From 1952 to 1953, he coached at North Carolina State University, where he compiled a 4–16 record.

Hendrickson played football, basketball and baseball at Duke University. He then served as director of athletics at Elon University, and coached football, baseball and basketball from 1937 to 1942. In 1942, he moved to the University of Pennsylvania replacing Howard Odell as the backfield coach on the football team.

== Family ==
Hendrickson was married to Gene Fulton Swartz of Derry, Pennsylvania on June 18, 1938. The couple had two sons: Richard Fulton and James Alva.

== Head coaching record ==
=== Football ===
Year	Team	Overall	Conference	Standing	Bowl/playoffs
Elon Fightin' Christians (North State Conference) (1937–1941)
1937	Elon	7–1	3–1	2nd	
1938	Elon	6–3	4–1	T–1st	
1939	Elon	5–5	4–2	3rd	
1940	Elon	5–2–1	5–1	2nd	
1941	Elon	8–1	6–0	1st	
Elon:		31–12–1	22–5		
NC State Wolfpack (Southern Conference) (1952)
1952	NC State	3–7	2–4	T–10th	
NC State Wolfpack (Atlantic Coast Conference) (1953)
1953	NC State	1–9	0–3	7th	
NC State:		4–16	2–7		
Total:		35–28–1			
National championship Conference title Conference division title or championship game berth
