= Jack Johnson (coach) =

American football, basketball, and baseball coach

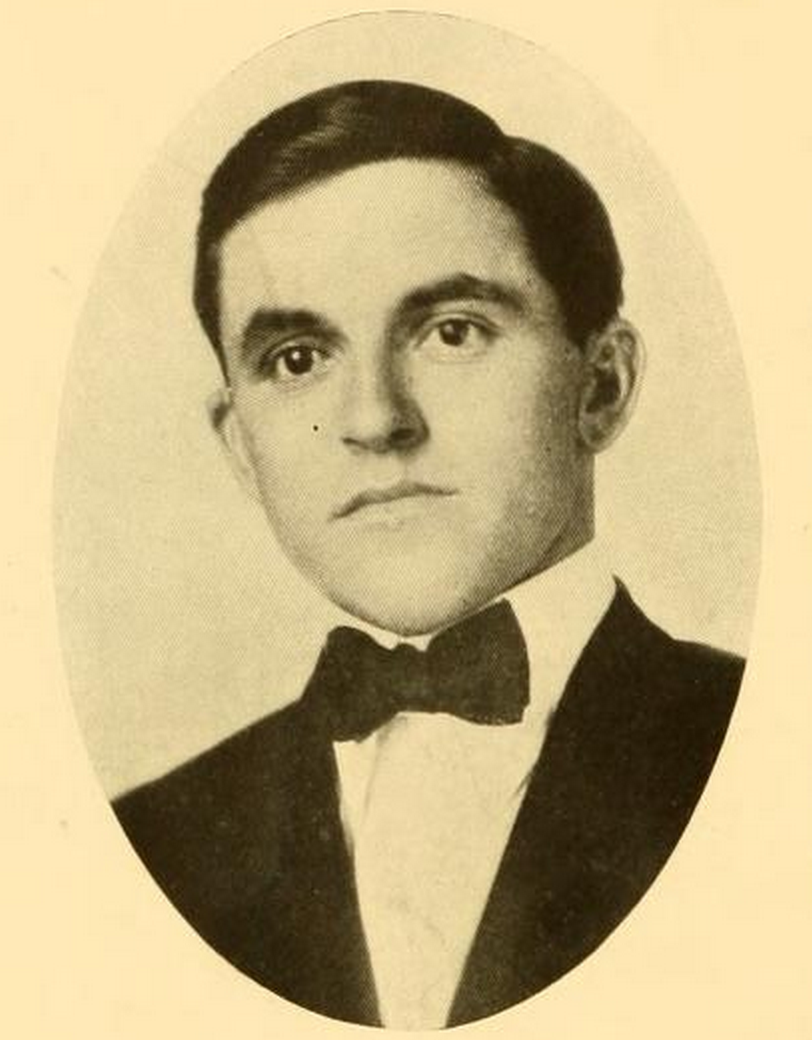
- Johnson pictured in Phi Psi Cli 1914, Elon yearbook

Biographical details
- Born: January 7, 1891; Siler City, North Carolina, U.S.
- Died: June 25, 1927 (aged 36); Boulder, Colorado, U.S.

Playing career

Basketball
- 1911–1914: Elon

Baseball
- 1911–1914: Elon

Coaching career (HC unless noted)

Football
- 1919: Elon

Basketball
- 1915–1920: Elon

Baseball
- 1916–1920: Elon
- 1926–1927: Colorado

Head coaching record
- Overall: 1–2 (football)

Clyde Carney "Jack" Johnson (January 7, 1891 – June 25, 1927) was an American football, basketball, and baseball coach. Johnson served as the head football coach at Elon College—now known as Elon University—in Elon, North Carolina, for one season, in 1919 season, compiling a record of 1–2. He also coached baseball for five seasons at Elon and for two at the University of Colorado.

Johnson died on June 25, 1927, from complications following appendicitis surgery in Boulder, Colorado.

== Head coaching record ==
=== Football ===
Year	Team	Overall	Conference	Standing	Bowl/playoffs
Elon Fightin' Christians (Independent) (1919)
1919	Elon	1–2			
Elon:		1–2			
Total:		1–2			
