= George Colliflower =

American basketball player-coach (1886–1980)

Biographical details
- Born: May 2, 1886
- Died: January 20, 1980 (aged 93)

Playing career
- 1907–1912: Georgetown
- Position: Forward

Coaching career (HC unless noted)
- c. 1914: Gonzaga College HS
- 1915–1917: George Washington

Head coaching record
- Overall: 9–18 (college)

George Clinton Colliflower (May 2, 1886 – January 20, 1980) was an American basketball player and coach. He was head basketball coach at George Washington University from 1915 to 1917.

Colliflower and his brother James attended Georgetown University. Colliflower played basketball as a forward and guard and baseball as a pitcher while at Georgetown. In basketball, Colliflower was described as a "husky" forward who was known for his "consistent performances ... both in goal tossing and making it almost impossible for his opponent to score." Colliflower's Georgetown career spanned from 1907 to 1912, extending from his undergraduate days to his enrollment in graduate school.

Following his college career, Colliflower played and coached for the Aloysius Club team, then coached at Gonzaga College High School while working with other Washington, D.C. basketball coaches and administrators to organize the game in the city.

Colliflower was named head coach at George Washington in 1915, succeeding Nathan Dougherty, serving in this role for two seasons. In the 1915–16 season, the Colonials went 7–8, and in 1916–17 they were 2–10.

== Personal life ==
George's older brother James later became head coach at Navy and Georgetown, and they at times faced each other on the sidelines. A third Colliflower brother, Joseph, was accidentally shot and killed in 1909 by a nine-year-old child in an accident involving a keepsake firearm. George Colliflower witnessed the accident and held his dying brother until medical help could arrive.

Colliflower was married on January 1, 1917, to Louise M. Hance. They had four children: Vera (born c. 1918), George, Jr. (born c. 1919), Joseph (born c. 1922), and Helen (born c. 1924).

Colliflower died in January 1980 at age 83. His last residence was in Anne Arundel, Maryland.
