= 1915–16 Kent State Normal College men's basketball team =

American college basketball season

1915–16 Kent State Normal College men's basketball
- Conference: Independent
- Record: 4–8
- Head coach: Donald Ulrich (1st season)

The 1915–16 Kent State Normal College men's basketball team was the men's basketball team at what is now Kent State University in Kent, Ohio, then known as Kent State Normal College. Prior to 1915, the school was called Kent State Normal School.

The men's basketball team played eight intercollegiate games in late 1915 and early 1916, losing the first seven, but finishing with a victory in the last game for a record of 1–7. The team also played four games against a local company team and local high schools, finishing the year with an overall record of 4–8. It was the first year for coach Dr. Donald Ulrich who took over for Normal's first coach Alexander Whyte.

There was not yet an established nickname for teams for the college, and the school colors were the original orange and blue. Dave Mitchell served as team captain with Louis Cort as manager. The team comprised Herbert Swigart (left guard), Watters (right guard) Jerosky (right guard), Cort (left forward), Sol Schneider (right forward), Mitchell (center) and Art Neate.

Early basketball games were held in various locations, such as the atrium of the original Administration Building (known as Cartwright Hall since 2006), in the basement of the original heating plant, and in the local Congregational Church gymnasium, as a permanent gymnasium was not built on campus until 1925.

== Schedule and results ==
Date time, TV	Opponent	Result	Record	Site city, state
December 10, 1915*	at Ashland	L 14–18	0–1	Ashland, OH
December 23, 1915*	at St. Ignatius	L 4–42	0–2	Cleveland, OH
January 12, 1916*	St. Ignatius	L 10–44	0–3	Kent, OH
January 15, 1916*	at Hiram	L 1–48	0–4	Hiram, OH
*	Davey Institute	L 12–29	0–5	Kent, OH
February 4, 1916*	West Lafayette^{a}	L 10–34	0–6	Kent, OH
February 11, 1916*	at West Lafayette	L 18–67	0–7	West Lafayette, OH
February 19, 1916*	Akron	L 16–37	0–8	Kent, OH
March 10, 1916*	Ashland	W 27–17	1–8	Kent, OH
*	Kent High	W 52–4	2–8	Kent, OH
*	Normal High	W 24–14	3–8	Kent, OH
*	Juniors	W 15–12	4–8	Kent, OH
*Non-conference game. (#) Tournament seedings in parentheses. Sources a. West Lafayette College, also known as Methodist Protestant College, in West Lafayette, Ohio was founded in 1894 and merged with Adrian College in Adrian, Michigan in 1916.

== See also ==
- List of Kent State Golden Flashes men's basketball seasons
