= Bob Doak =

American football, basketball, and baseball coach

Biographical details
- Born: March 16, 1881
- Died: July 1, 1942 (aged 61)

Playing career

Basketball
- 1905–1909: Guilford

Basketball
- 1906–1909: Guilford

Coaching career (HC unless noted)

Football
- 1916–1926: Guilford

Basketball
- 1910–1915: Elon
- 1915–1916: Duke

Baseball
- 1912–1915: Guilford
- 1916–1927: Elon

Administrative career (AD unless noted)
- 1912–1915: Elon
- 1916–1927: Guilford

Head coaching record
- Overall: 13–51–5 (football)

Robert Sydens Doak (March 16, 1881 – July 1, 1942) was an American football, basketball, and baseball coach. His stops included Elon University, Duke University, and Guilford College. Doak also served as Elon's and Guilford's athletic director during his tenures at the school. He was succeeded by his brother, Chick Doak, as Duke's head basketball coach in 1916.

== Head coaching record ==
=== Basketball ===
Record table
Season	Team	Overall	Conference	Standing	Postseason
Elon Phoenix (Independent) (1911–1915)
1910–11	Elon	1–3			
1911–12	Elon	1–8			
1912–13	Elon	5–10			
1913–14	Elon	8–9			
1914–15	Elon	12–6			
Elon:		27–36			
Trinity Blue and White (Independent) (1915–1916)
1915–16	Trinity	9–11			
Trinity:		9–11			
Total:		36–47			
National champion Postseason invitational champion Conference regular season champion Conference regular season and conference tournament champion Division regular season champion Division regular season and conference tournament champion Conference tournament champion
