= Everett May =

American military officer & athletics coach

Thomas Everett May
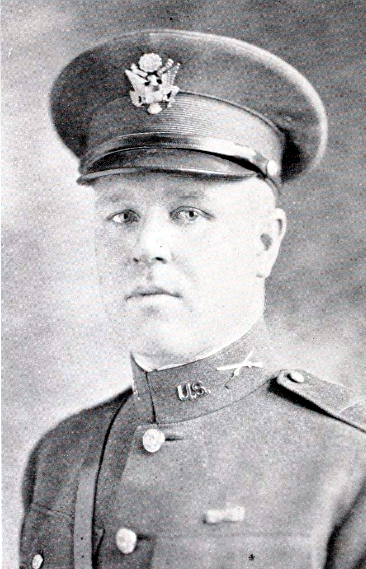
- May at Clemson in 1924

Biographical details
- Born: March 5, 1888; Abilene, Kansas, U.S.
- Died: April 5, 1965 (aged 77); Monterey, California, U.S.

Playing career
- 1910–1914: Oregon Agricultural
- Positions: Guard (basketball); Tackle (football)

Coaching career (HC unless noted)

Basketball
- 1915–16: Oregon Agricultural (graduate manager)
- 1916–17: Oregon Agricultural

Baseball
- 1925: Clemson

Football
- 1922–1924: Clemson (assistant)

Head coaching record
- Overall: 11–7 (basketball); 11–14 (baseball)

Thomas Everett May (March 5, 1888 – April 5, 1965) was an American military officer and athletics coach. Born in Abeline, Kansas in 1888, May moved with his family to Sherman County, Oregon, in 1900. He went on to graduate from Oregon Agricultural College (now Oregon State University), where he was a member of Phi Delta Theta. He played on the football team from 1910 through 1913, and the basketball team from 1912 through 1914. May remained at OAC as assistant basketball coach and later successor to E. J. Stewart, leading the 1917 team to an 11–7 record and 4th-place finish in the Pacific Coast Conference.

May joined the United States Army in 1917, and was a member of the 1917 Camp Lewis football team that played in the Rose Bowl. He served in France during World War I and was wounded at Argonne.

Following the war, May was stationed at Clemson College (now University) as part of the ROTC staff. Reunited with coach E. J. Stewart, May served as an assistant football coach in the 1922 through 1924 seasons, and as head baseball coach in 1925.

May retired to Carmel, California, after 28 years in the Army, and died in 1965.
