= Frank Corboy =

American sports coach and college athletics administrator

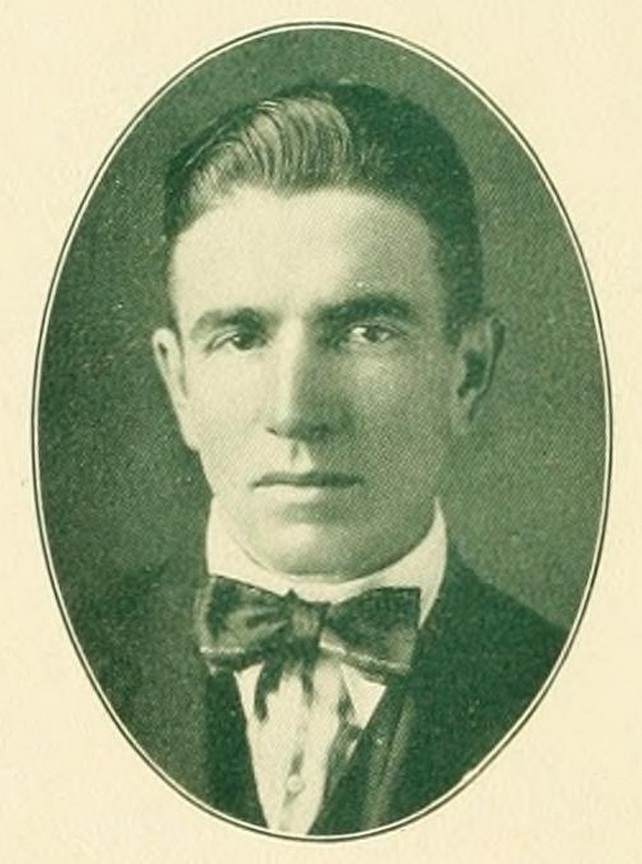
- Corboy pictured in Phi Psi Cli 1921, Elon yearbook

Biographical details
- Born: August 12, 1888; Bedford, Pennsylvania, U.S.
- Died: March 21, 1948 (aged 59); Orlando, Florida, U.S.
- Education: University of Pittsburgh, Muhlenberg College, University of Toulouse

Coaching career (HC unless noted)

Football
- 1920–1925: Elon

Basketball
- 1920–1926: Elon

Baseball
- 1921–1926: Elon

Administrative career (AD unless noted)
- 1921–1926: Elon

Head coaching record
- Overall: 17–31–3 (football); 51–53 (basketball); 32–62 (baseball)

Frank Bradshaw Corboy (August 12, 1888 – March 21, 1948) was an American football, basketball, and baseball coach and college athletics administrator. He was an alumnus of the University of Pittsburgh, Muhlenberg College, and the University of Toulouse, in France.

== Coaching career ==
Corboy was the head football coach at Elon University in Elon, North Carolina. He held that position for six seasons, from 1920 until 1925. His coaching record at Elon was 17–31–3.

== Death ==
Corboy died in Orlando, Florida in 1948.

== Head coaching record ==
=== Football ===
Year	Team	Overall	Conference	Standing	Bowl/playoffs
Elon Fightin' Christians (Independent) (1920–1925)
1920	Elon	3–4			
1921	Elon	3–4–2			
1922	Elon	5–4–1			
1923	Elon	4–4			
1924	Elon	0–7			
1925	Elon	2–8			
Elon:		17–31–3			
Total:		17–31–3			
