= Roy Geary (basketball) =

American basketball player and coach (1892–1952)

Personal information
- Born: November 6, 1892
- Died: February 15, 1952 (aged 59) Bethlehem, Pennsylvania, U.S.

Career information
- Playing career: 1912–1924

Career history

Playing
- 1912–1915: Hazleton Professionals
- 1914–1915: Tamaqua Tams
- 1915–1916: Hazleton Mountaineers
- 1916: De Neri Duddies
- 1916–1917: Allentown Temperance Five
- 1917–1918: Hazleton Mountaineers
- 1919–1923: Allentown Saints

Coaching
- 1916–1919: Lehigh
- 1926–1932: Lehigh

Roy Charles Geary (November 6, 1892 – February 15, 1952) was an American basketball player and coach who was the head men's basketball coach at Lehigh University. Geary played professional basketball in Lehigh Valley for over a decade. He had two stints as head coach of the Lehigh men's basketball (1916–1919 and 1926–1932) and compiled a 79–66 over nine seasons. Outside of basketball, Geary was the sealer of weights and measures for Bethlehem, Pennsylvania.
