= 1914–15 Missouri Tigers men's basketball team =

American college basketball season

1914–15 Missouri Tigers men's basketball
- Conference: Big Eight Conference
- Record: 8–6 (6–6 MVIAA)
- Head coach: Eugene Van Gent
- Home arena: Rothwell Gymnasium

The 1914–15 Missouri Tigers men's basketball team represented University of Missouri in the 1914–15 college basketball season. The team was led by first year head coach Eugene Van Gent. The captain of the team was George Palfreyman.

Missouri finished with an 8–6 record overall and a 6–6 record in the Missouri Valley Intercollegiate Athletic Association. This was good enough for a 3rd-place finish in the regular season conference standings.

== Schedule and results ==
Date time, TV	Rank^{#}	Opponent^{#}	Result	Record	Site city, state
January 16*		Tarkio	W 29–11	1–0	Columbia, Missouri
January 17*		Central Methodist	W 39–23	2–0	Columbia, Missouri
February 8		Washington University	W 52–18	3–0 (1–0)	Columbia, Missouri
February 9		Washington University	W 28–16	4–0 (2–0)	Columbia, Missouri
February 16		at Kansas State	W 26–16	5–0 (3–0)	Manhattan, Kansas
February 17		at Kansas State	W 26–19	6–0 (4–0)	Manhattan, Kansas
February 19		at Kansas	L 19–44	6–1 (4–1)	Lawrence, Kansas
February 20		at Kansas	L 23–42	6–2 (4–2)	Lawrence, Kansas
February 24		Kansas	L 22–33	6–3 (4–3)	Columbia, Missouri
February 25		Kansas	L 26–40	6–4 (4–4)	Columbia, Missouri
March 1		Kansas State	L 19–28	6–5 (4–5)	Columbia, Missouri
March 2		Kansas State	W 32–16	7–5 (5–5)	Columbia, Missouri
March 5		at Washington University	L 23–26	7–6 (5–6)	St. Louis, Missouri
March 6		at Washington University	W 29–28	8–6 (6–6)	St. Louis, Missouri
*Non-conference game. ^{#}Rankings from Coaches' Poll. (#) Tournament seedings in parentheses. All times are in Central Standard Time.
