= Harry Haring =

American basketball player and coach (1877–1968)

Personal information
- Born: August 24, 1877
- Died: December 2, 1968 (aged 91)
- Listed height: 5 ft 11 in (1.80 m)
- Listed weight: 170 lb (77 kg)

Career information
- Playing career: 1902–1915

Career history

Playing
- 1902–1915: Paterson Crescents

Coaching
- 1903–1904: Patterson High School
- 1915–1916: Lehigh
- 1916–1918: NYU
- 1920: Paterson Crescents

Harry Van Emburgh Haring (August 24, 1877 – December 2, 1968) was an American basketball player and coach who played for the Paterson Crescents and was the head coach at Lehigh University and New York University.

== Playing ==
Haring played for the Paterson Crescents from 1902 to 1915. He also played eight games for the Cohoes Co. B team in the New York State League and one game for the Ware Wonders of Massachusetts Central Basketball League. He played football and baseball for the Totowa Field Club.

== Coaching ==
Haring was the head basketball and football coach at Patterson High School during the 1903–04 school year. In 1915, he was named head basketball coach of the Lehigh men's basketball team. From 1916 to 1918, he was the head coach of the NYU Violets men's basketball team. His overall record at the college level is 22–24. In 1920, Haring and Arthur Post coached the new Patterson franchise in the Pennsylvania State Basketball League. The reborn Crescents went 3–9 before dropping out of the league on December 14, 1920.
