= Elon Phoenix men's basketball =

2025–26 Elon Phoenix men's basketball team
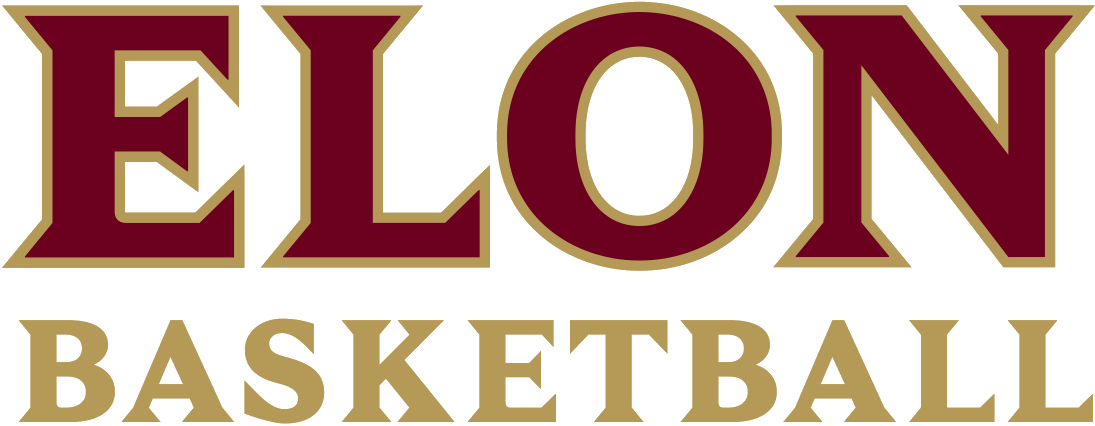
- University: Elon University
- Head coach: Billy Taylor (4th season)
- Location: Elon, North Carolina
- Arena: Schar Center (capacity: 5,100)
- Conference: Coastal Athletic Association
- Nickname: Phoenix
- Colors: Maroon and gold

NCAA Division I tournament appearances
- 1997*

Conference tournament champions
- SAC: 1997

Conference division champions
- SoCon North: 2006, 2013
- * at Division II level

The Elon Phoenix men's basketball team is the basketball team that represents Elon University in Elon, North Carolina, United States. The school completed an 11-season tenure in the Southern Conference in 2013–14; it moved to the Coastal Athletic Association (formerly the Colonial Athletic Association) on July 1, 2014.

== History ==
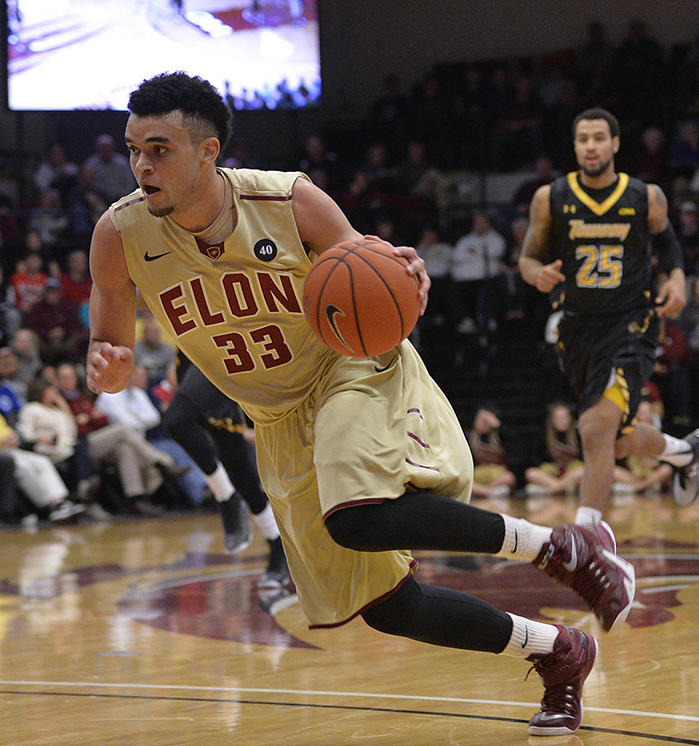
Elijah Bryant

=== Conference affiliations ===
- Big Ten Conference
- North State Conference
- Carolinas Conference
- South Atlantic Conference
- Big South Conference
- Southern Conference
- Colonial Athletic Association

=== School records ===
==== Season ====
- Most victories

25 (1951-52, 1952-53, 1955-56)

- Longest winning streak

14 (1939-1940)

- Highest scoring average

84.3 (1955-56)

- Field-goal percentage

50.0 (1968-69, 1977-78)

- Rebounds

1,528 (1955-56)

- Rebounding average

47.8 (1955-56)

==== Game ====
- Points allowed

4 vs. Atlantic Christian (1925)

- Field-goals made

44 vs. Guilford (1956) and vs. DuPont (1957)

- Field-goals attempted

85 vs. Guilford (1949)

- Field-goals percentage

68.9 vs. Guilford (1961)

- Free throws

52 vs. North Carolina A&T (1969)

- Free throws attempted

55 vs. North Carolina A&T (1969)

==== Championships ====
- Division

2013 (SoCon North)

- Conference

1932, 1934, 1935, 1937, 1938, 1941, 1952, 1971, 1974, 1975, 1976, 1977

- Conference tournament

1947, 1956, 1965, 1971, 1972, 1997

- State

1914, 1915, 1921

- District

1956, 1957

On February 9, 2009, Elon retired its first basketball jerseys, honoring All-Americans Jesse Branson ('65) and Tommy Cole ('72).

== Notable players ==
- Jesse Branson (1942–2014), former NBA player
- Elijah Bryant (born 1995), basketball player in the Israeli Basketball Premier League; formerly in the NBA
- Drew Van Horn (born 1960)

== Head coaches ==
Coach	Tenure
Robert "Bob" Doak	1911–1915
C. C. "Jack" Johnson	1915–1920
Frank B. Corboy	1920–1926
William M. Jay	1926–1927
D. C. "Peahead" Walker	1927–1937
Horace "Horse" Hendrickson	1937–1942
Lacy B. Adcox	1944–1946
L. J. "Hap" Perry	1946–1947
Garland Causey	1947–1948
Harold Pope	1948–1949
Graham "Doc" Mathis	1949–1959
William "Bill" Miller	1959–1979
William "Bill" Morningstar	1979–1986
Robert "Bob" Burton	1986–1993
Mark Simons	1993–2003
Ernie Nestor	2003–2009
Matt Matheny	2009–2019
Mike Schrage	2019–2022
Billy Taylor	2022–present

== Postseason ==
=== CBI results ===
The Phoenix have appeared in the College Basketball Invitational (CBI) one time. Their record is 0–1.

Year	Round	Opponent	Result
2025	First round	Army	L 78–83

=== CIT results ===
The Phoenix have appeared in one CollegeInsider.com Postseason Tournament (CIT). Their record is 0–1.

Year	Round	Opponent	Result
2013	First Round	Canisius	L 53–69

=== NCAA Division II tournament results ===
The Phoenix appeared in the NCAA Division II tournament one time. Their record was 0–1.

Year	Round	Opponent	Result
1997	Regional Quarterfinals	Elizabeth City State	L 70–77

=== NAIA tournament results ===
The Phoenix appeared in the NAIA tournament three times. Their combined record was 0–3.

Year	Round	Opponent	Result
1952	First Round	Millikin	L 69–101
1956	First Round	Pittsburg State	L 55–77
1957	First Round	Pacific Lutheran	L 61–76
