= 1915–16 Missouri Tigers men's basketball team =

American college basketball season

1915–16 Missouri Tigers men's basketball
- Conference: Big Eight Conference
- Record: 12–3 (9–2 MVIAA)
- Head coach: Eugene Van Gent
- Home arena: Rothwell Gymnasium

The 1915–16 Missouri Tigers men's basketball team represented University of Missouri in the 1915–16 college basketball season. The team was led by second year head coach Eugene Van Gent. The captain of the team was John Wear.

Missouri finished with a 12–3 record overall and a 9–2 record in the Missouri Valley Intercollegiate Athletic Association. This was good enough for a 2nd-place finish in the regular season conference standings.

== Schedule and results ==
Date time, TV	Rank^{#}	Opponent^{#}	Result	Record	Site city, state
January 8*		Northwest Missouri	W 49–25	1–0	Columbia, Missouri
January 10		Washington (MO)	W 45–21	2–0 (1–0)	Columbia, Missouri
January 14		at Iowa State	W 26–12	3–0 (2–0)	Ames, Iowa
January 15		at Iowa State	W 21–15	4–0 (3–0)	Ames, Iowa
January 20*		Central Methodist	W 44–19	5–0 (3–0)	Columbia, Missouri
February 9		Kansas	W 30–24	6–0 (4–0)	Columbia, Missouri
February 10		Kansas	W 42–20	7–0 (5–0)	Columbia, Missouri
February 16*		Oklahoma	W 50–20	8–0 (5–0)	Columbia, Missouri
February 17*		Oklahoma	L 28–29	8–1 (5–0)	Columbia, Missouri
February 18		at Washington (MO)	W 23–17	9–1 (6–0)	St. Louis, Missouri
February 19		at Washington (MO)	W 41–19	10–1 (7–0)	St. Louis, Missouri
February 25		at Kansas State	L 19–27	10–2 (7–1)	Manhattan, Kansas
February 26		at Kansas State	W 22–10	11–2 (8–1)	Manhattan, Kansas
February 28		at Kansas	W 41–10	12–2 (9–1)	Lawrence, Kansas
February 29		at Kansas	L 19–31	12–3 (9–2)	Lawrence, Kansas
*Non-conference game. ^{#}Rankings from Coaches' Poll. (#) Tournament seedings in parentheses. All times are in Central Standard Time.
