= 1918–19 William & Mary Indians men's basketball team =

American college basketball season

1918–19 William & Mary Indians men's basketball
- Conference: Independent
- Record: 3–6
- Head coach: Vernon Geddy (1st season)

1918–19 NCAA men's basketball independents standings
	Conf.				Overall
Team	W		L	PCT	W		L	PCT
Akron		–		–	14	–	0	1.000
Centre (KY)		–		–	11	–	0	1.000
The Citadel		–		–	9	–	0	1.000
Creighton		–		–	14	–	0	1.000
Louisiana State		–		–	1	–	0	1.000
Navy		–		–	16	–	0	1.000
Niagara		–		–	1	–	0	1.000
Oklahoma		–		–	12	–	0	1.000
Washington College		–		–	1	–	0	1.000
Santa Clara		–		–	14	–	1	.933
Southwestern (KS)		–		–	13	–	1	.929
Georgetown		–		–	9	–	1	.900
Rhode Island State		–		–	7	–	1	.875
Idaho		–		–	13	–	2	.867
Beloit		–		–	12	–	2	.857
Roanoke		–		–	12	–	2	.857
Penn State		–		–	11	–	2	.846
Toledo		–		–	10	–	2	.833
Fordham		–		–	24	–	5	.828
Virginia Tech		–		–	18	–	4	.818
Bucknell		–		–	13	–	3	.813
Denison		–		–	13	–	3	.813
Syracuse		–		–	13	–	3	.813
Delaware		–		–	8	–	2	.800
DePauw		–		–	12	–	3	.800
New Mexico A&M		–		–	8	–	2	.800
Vanderbilt		–		–	8	–	2	.800
North Carolina State		–		–	11	–	3	.786
Utah		–		–	7	–	2	.778
Wyoming		–		–	7	–	2	.778
Washington and Lee		–		–	10	–	3	.769
Wabash		–		–	13	–	4	.765
Clemson		–		–	3	–	1	.750
Lafayette		–		–	12	–	4	.750
Millikin		–		–	12	–	4	.750
Millsaps		–		–	9	–	3	.750
North Dakota		–		–	6	–	2	.750
Saint Francis (PA)		–		–	9	–	3	.750
Virginia		–		–	11	–	4	.733
Western State Normal		–		–	11	–	4	.733
Carleton		–		–	8	–	3	.727
Union (NY)		–		–	8	–	3	.727
Michigan State Normal		–		–	10	–	4	.714
Central Missouri		–		–	14	–	6	.700
Washington & Jefferson		–		–	7	–	3	.700
Colgate		–		–	13	–	6	.684
Arizona		–		–	6	–	3	.667
CCNY		–		–	8	–	4	.667
Indiana State		–		–	6	–	3	.667
Northern Arizona Normal		–		–	4	–	2	.667
Rutgers		–		–	6	–	3	.667
Tulane		–		–	6	–	3	.667
Utah State		–		–	6	–	3	.667
Washburn		–		–	10	–	5	.667
Gettysburg		–		–	9	–	5	.643
North Dakota Agricultural		–		–	9	–	5	.643
Louisville		–		–	7	–	4	.636
Mount Union		–		–	7	–	4	.636
Brigham Young		–		–	5	–	3	.625
Georgia		–		–	5	–	3	.625
Tulsa		–		–	5	–	3	.625
Buffalo		–		–	8	–	5	.615
Lehigh		–		–	8	–	5	.615
Stevens Institute		–		–	8	–	5	.615
WPI		–		–	8	–	5	.615
Miami (Ohio)		–		–	7	–	5	.583
Auburn		–		–	4	–	3	.571
Catholic		–		–	4	–	3	.571
Marietta		–		–	8	–	6	.571
Mississippi A&M		–		–	4	–	3	.571
VMI		–		–	8	–	6	.571
North Carolina		–		–	9	–	7	.563
Ohio		–		–	5	–	4	.556
Trinity (N.C.)		–		–	6	–	5	.545
Franklin		–		–	7	–	6	.538
Alabama		–		–	3	–	3	.500
Kalamazoo		–		–	7	–	7	.500
Michigan State		–		–	9	–	9	.500
Oklahoma A&M		–		–	5	–	5	.500
Pittsburgh		–		–	7	–	7	.500
St. Joseph's		–		–	3	–	3	.500
West Virginia		–		–	8	–	8	.500
New York University		–		–	5	–	6	.455
Swarthmore		–		–	5	–	6	.455
Detroit		–		–	4	–	5	.444
Dayton		–		–	3	–	4	.429
Tempe Normal		–		–	3	–	4	.429
Kentucky		–		–	6	–	8	.429
Wooster		–		–	6	–	8	.429
Bradley		–		–	6	–	9	.400
Duquesne		–		–	4	–	6	.400
Springfield (Mass.)		–		–	4	–	6	.400
Texas Christian		–		–	4	–	6	.400
Wake Forest		–		–	6	–	9	.400
Muhlenberg		–		–	7	–	11	.389
Nevada		–		–	5	–	8	.385
Army		–		–	3	–	5	.375
South Carolina		–		–	4	–	7	.364
Northern Colorado		–		–	5	–	9	.357
Davidson		–		–	3	–	6	.333
Manhattan		–		–	2	–	4	.333
Montana State		–		–	1	–	2	.333
New Mexico		–		–	2	–	4	.333
Saint Louis		–		–	4	–	8	.333
Saint Mary's (CA)		–		–	3	–	6	.333
Valparaiso		–		–	1	–	2	.333
William & Mary		–		–	3	–	6	.333
Bowling Green State		–		–	2	–	5	.286
Marshall		–		–	2	–	5	.286
Southern California		–		–	3	–	8	.273
Grove City		–		–	3	–	9	.250
Tennessee		–		–	2	–	6	.250
Cincinnati		–		–	3	–	11	.214
North Central		–		–	3	–	11	.214
Notre Dame		–		–	2	–	10	.167
Richmond		–		–	1	–	5	.167
Brown		–		–	2	–	12	.143
Fairmount		–		–	1	–	7	.125
Connecticut		–		–	1	–	8	.111
Butler		–		–	1	–	9	.100
Ole Miss		–		–	0	–	3	.000
St. John's (NY)		–		–	0	–	7	.000

The 1918–19 William & Mary Indians men's basketball team represented the College of William & Mary in intercollegiate basketball during the 1918–19 season. Under the first, and only, year of head coach Vernon Geddy (who, like his predecessor, concurrently served as head football coach), the team finished the season with a 3–6 record. This was the 14th season in program history for William & Mary, whose nickname is now the Tribe.

== Schedule ==
Date time, TV	Rank^{#}	Opponent^{#}	Result	Record	Site city, state
Regular season
*		Randolph–Macon	L 12–35	0–1	Williamsburg, VA
2/8/1918*		at Richmond	W 33–17	1–1	Richmond, VA
*		Hampden–Sydney	W 18–17	2–1	Williamsburg, VA
2/15/1918*		Richmond	W 20–19	3–1	Williamsburg, VA
*		Randolph–Macon	L 22–40	3–2	Williamsburg, VA
*		Hampden–Sydney	L 17–33	3–3	Williamsburg, VA
*		VMI	L 6–66	3–4	Williamsburg, VA
*		Washington & Lee	L 9–67	3–5	Williamsburg, VA
*		Roanoke College	L 6–87	3–6	Williamsburg, VA
*Non-conference game. ^{#}Rankings from AP Poll. (#) Tournament seedings in parentheses.
