= 1918–19 Georgetown Hoyas men's basketball team =

American college basketball season

1918–19 Georgetown Hoyas men's basketball
- Conference: Independent
- Record: 9–1
- Head coach: John O'Reilly (5th season)
- Captain: Fred Fees
- Home arena: Ryan Gymnasium

1918–19 NCAA men's basketball independents standings
	Conf.				Overall
Team	W		L	PCT	W		L	PCT
Akron		–		–	14	–	0	1.000
Centre (KY)		–		–	11	–	0	1.000
The Citadel		–		–	9	–	0	1.000
Creighton		–		–	14	–	0	1.000
Louisiana State		–		–	1	–	0	1.000
Navy		–		–	16	–	0	1.000
Niagara		–		–	1	–	0	1.000
Oklahoma		–		–	12	–	0	1.000
Washington College		–		–	1	–	0	1.000
Santa Clara		–		–	14	–	1	.933
Southwestern (KS)		–		–	13	–	1	.929
Georgetown		–		–	9	–	1	.900
Rhode Island State		–		–	7	–	1	.875
Idaho		–		–	13	–	2	.867
Beloit		–		–	12	–	2	.857
Roanoke		–		–	12	–	2	.857
Penn State		–		–	11	–	2	.846
Toledo		–		–	10	–	2	.833
Fordham		–		–	24	–	5	.828
Virginia Tech		–		–	18	–	4	.818
Bucknell		–		–	13	–	3	.813
Denison		–		–	13	–	3	.813
Syracuse		–		–	13	–	3	.813
Delaware		–		–	8	–	2	.800
DePauw		–		–	12	–	3	.800
New Mexico A&M		–		–	8	–	2	.800
Vanderbilt		–		–	8	–	2	.800
North Carolina State		–		–	11	–	3	.786
Utah		–		–	7	–	2	.778
Wyoming		–		–	7	–	2	.778
Washington and Lee		–		–	10	–	3	.769
Wabash		–		–	13	–	4	.765
Clemson		–		–	3	–	1	.750
Lafayette		–		–	12	–	4	.750
Millikin		–		–	12	–	4	.750
Millsaps		–		–	9	–	3	.750
North Dakota		–		–	6	–	2	.750
Saint Francis (PA)		–		–	9	–	3	.750
Virginia		–		–	11	–	4	.733
Western State Normal		–		–	11	–	4	.733
Carleton		–		–	8	–	3	.727
Union (NY)		–		–	8	–	3	.727
Michigan State Normal		–		–	10	–	4	.714
Central Missouri		–		–	14	–	6	.700
Washington & Jefferson		–		–	7	–	3	.700
Colgate		–		–	13	–	6	.684
Arizona		–		–	6	–	3	.667
CCNY		–		–	8	–	4	.667
Indiana State		–		–	6	–	3	.667
Northern Arizona Normal		–		–	4	–	2	.667
Rutgers		–		–	6	–	3	.667
Tulane		–		–	6	–	3	.667
Utah State		–		–	6	–	3	.667
Washburn		–		–	10	–	5	.667
Gettysburg		–		–	9	–	5	.643
North Dakota Agricultural		–		–	9	–	5	.643
Louisville		–		–	7	–	4	.636
Mount Union		–		–	7	–	4	.636
Brigham Young		–		–	5	–	3	.625
Georgia		–		–	5	–	3	.625
Tulsa		–		–	5	–	3	.625
Buffalo		–		–	8	–	5	.615
Lehigh		–		–	8	–	5	.615
Stevens Institute		–		–	8	–	5	.615
WPI		–		–	8	–	5	.615
Miami (Ohio)		–		–	7	–	5	.583
Auburn		–		–	4	–	3	.571
Catholic		–		–	4	–	3	.571
Marietta		–		–	8	–	6	.571
Mississippi A&M		–		–	4	–	3	.571
VMI		–		–	8	–	6	.571
North Carolina		–		–	9	–	7	.563
Ohio		–		–	5	–	4	.556
Trinity (N.C.)		–		–	6	–	5	.545
Franklin		–		–	7	–	6	.538
Alabama		–		–	3	–	3	.500
Kalamazoo		–		–	7	–	7	.500
Michigan State		–		–	9	–	9	.500
Oklahoma A&M		–		–	5	–	5	.500
Pittsburgh		–		–	7	–	7	.500
St. Joseph's		–		–	3	–	3	.500
West Virginia		–		–	8	–	8	.500
New York University		–		–	5	–	6	.455
Swarthmore		–		–	5	–	6	.455
Detroit		–		–	4	–	5	.444
Dayton		–		–	3	–	4	.429
Tempe Normal		–		–	3	–	4	.429
Kentucky		–		–	6	–	8	.429
Wooster		–		–	6	–	8	.429
Bradley		–		–	6	–	9	.400
Duquesne		–		–	4	–	6	.400
Springfield (Mass.)		–		–	4	–	6	.400
Texas Christian		–		–	4	–	6	.400
Wake Forest		–		–	6	–	9	.400
Muhlenberg		–		–	7	–	11	.389
Nevada		–		–	5	–	8	.385
Army		–		–	3	–	5	.375
South Carolina		–		–	4	–	7	.364
Northern Colorado		–		–	5	–	9	.357
Davidson		–		–	3	–	6	.333
Manhattan		–		–	2	–	4	.333
Montana State		–		–	1	–	2	.333
New Mexico		–		–	2	–	4	.333
Saint Louis		–		–	4	–	8	.333
Saint Mary's (CA)		–		–	3	–	6	.333
Valparaiso		–		–	1	–	2	.333
William & Mary		–		–	3	–	6	.333
Bowling Green State		–		–	2	–	5	.286
Marshall		–		–	2	–	5	.286
Southern California		–		–	3	–	8	.273
Grove City		–		–	3	–	9	.250
Tennessee		–		–	2	–	6	.250
Cincinnati		–		–	3	–	11	.214
North Central		–		–	3	–	11	.214
Notre Dame		–		–	2	–	10	.167
Richmond		–		–	1	–	5	.167
Brown		–		–	2	–	12	.143
Fairmount		–		–	1	–	7	.125
Connecticut		–		–	1	–	8	.111
Butler		–		–	1	–	9	.100
Ole Miss		–		–	0	–	3	.000
St. John's (NY)		–		–	0	–	7	.000

The 1918–19 Georgetown Hoyas men's basketball team represented Georgetown University during the 1918–19 NCAA college basketball season. John O'Reilly coached the team in his fifth season as head coach. Georgetown was an independent and played its home games at Ryan Gymnasium on the Georgetown campus in Washington, D.C. Amid the raging Spanish influenza pandemic, the Hoyas met only local teams and played a shortened season, which they finished with a record of 9–1.

== Season recap ==
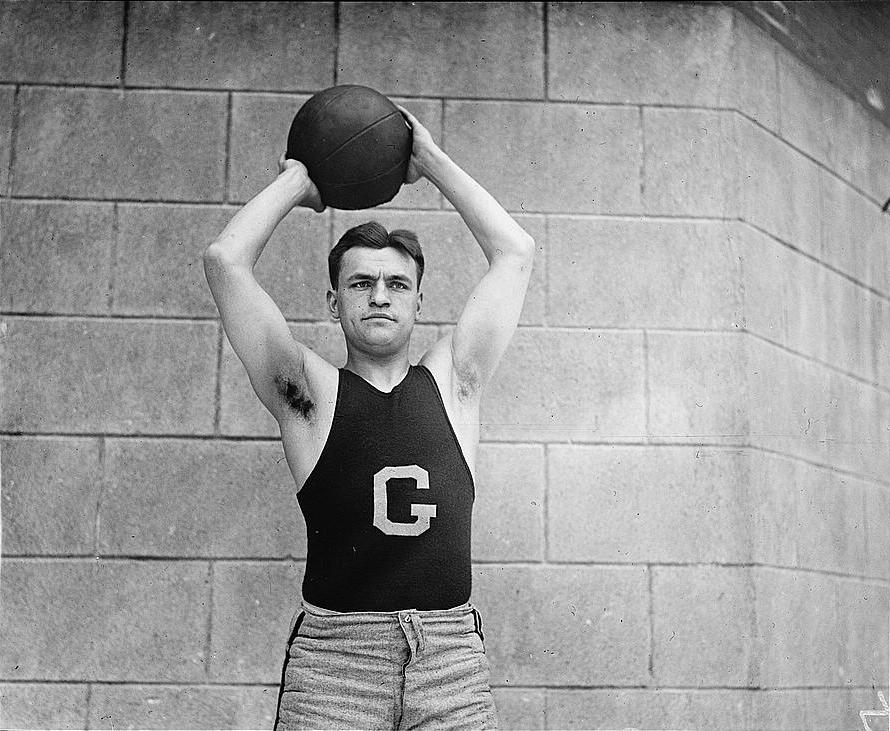
Forward Bill Dudack, seen in 1920, was a sophomore in 1918-19 and lettered for the team. After graduating in 1921, he returned to Georgetown to coach the 1929–30 team.

On-campus Ryan Gymnasium, where the Hoyas had played their home games since the 1914–15 season, had no seating, accommodating fans on a standing-room only-basis on an indoor track above the court. This precluded the accommodation of significant crowds, providing the self-sustaining Basketball Association with little revenue with which to fund the team's travel expenses, and Georgetown averaged no more than three road games a year from this season through the 1926-27 season in order to keep travel to a minimum. The 1918–19 team's only road trip outside of Washington was to Annapolis, Maryland, to play a game at Navy.

The 1918–1919 season took place in between a second and third wave of the 1918–1919 influenza pandemic, the so-called "Spanish flu." In response to the second wave, which spread during September 1918, the District of Columbia government shut down most public activities for a month during September and October, and all team sports at Georgetown went into hiatus during that month. After a shortened football season in 1918, Georgetown turned its attention to basketball, but the customary early December start of the basketball season was delayed, and Georgetown basketball did not begin play until January 1919. To avoid playing during a possible third wave of the pandemic in the spring of 1919 — which, in fact, did occur — Georgetown's schedule was limited to 10 games, which the team completed in only 36 days, playing its final game on February 15, 1919. No Georgetown students died of influenza during the pandemic, but two former Georgetown basketball players — John Martin, a forward on the 1912–1913 team, and Alexander "Pat" Finnegan, a guard on the 1917–1918 team — died of it while serving in the U.S. armed forces during World War I, Finnegan shortly after receiving his United States Army commission.

The Hoyas' home winning streak at Ryan Gymnasium reached 17 games at the end of this season, dating back to a victory against Bucknell on the last day of the 1916–17 season; it would reach 52 before finally coming to an end during the 1923–24 season. Georgetown also defeated crosstown rival George Washington twice this season, giving the Hoyas a 10-game winning streak against George Washington – eight of the wins at Ryan Gymnasium – dating back to 1915.

Forward and team captain Fred Fees, a student at Georgetown University Law School, was in his third season with the Hoyas. A free-throw shooting specialist in an era when the rules of college basketball allowed teams to choose which player shot its free throws, Fees had exploited his free-throw prowess to establish himself as one of the top scorers in college basketball in the United States in each of his seasons with the Hoyas. This season he played in all 10 games and scored 163 points, averaging 16.3 points per game.

Freshman forward Jack Flavin joined the team this season. He played in only six games but scored 54 points, an average of 9.0 points per game. He would become a starter the next season on his way to becoming one of the great Georgetown players of the era.

Freshman guard Andrew "Andy" Zazzali also joined the team. He played in all 10 games and averaged 6.2 points per game, and with 62 points was second only to Fees in scoring for the season.

One of the team's scheduled games was cancelled, and its only loss was at Navy in the third game of the year. It won the last seven games of the season to finish with a 9-1 record. Because of the shortened season, varsity players were granted an additional year of college eligibility, allowing Georgetown to return all five starters from the 1918–1919 team for the 1919–1920 season. The 1918–1919 team′s .900 winning percentage was the best in Georgetown men's basketball history at the time, but the Hoyas would exceed it the following year.

== Roster ==
Georgetown players did not wear numbers on their jerseys this season. The first numbered jerseys in Georgetown men's basketball history would not appear until the 1933–34 season.

Sophomore forward Bill Dudack later served as the Hoyas′ head coach during the 1929–30 season.

Name	Height	Weight (lbs.)	Position	Class	Hometown	Previous Team(s)
George Carney	N/A	N/A	G	Fr.	N/A	N/A
Bill Dudack	N/A	N/A	F	Jr.	New Britain, CT, U.S.	New Britain HS
Fred Fees	5'6"	N/A	F	Grad. Stud.	Carrolltown, PA, U.S.	St. Francis College (Pa.)
Jack Flavin	5'11"	175	F	Fr.	Portland, ME, U.S.	Portland HS
Francis Kelly	N/A	N/A	F	Sr.	N/A	N/A
William McMahon	N/A	N/A	F	Sr.	N/A	N/A
James McNally	N/A	N/A	F	Sr.	N/A	N/A
John O'Brien	N/A	N/A	G	N/A	N/A	N/A
Joe O'Connell	N/A	N/A	C	Fr.	N/A	N/A
Spencer Wise	N/A	N/A	G	Sr.	N/A	N/A
Andy Zazzali	N/A	N/A	G	Fr.	Baltimore, MD, U.S.	Mount St. Joseph HS

== 1918–19 schedule and results ==
Notes (Note: Sources all agree that Georgetown's record for the season was 9–1, but the schedule posted by The Georgetown Basketball History Project – which also states that the overall record was 9–1 – shows 11 games played, consisting of 10 wins and 1 loss. The 2012-2013 Georgetown Men's Basketball Media Guide, p. 58, only lists 10 games – 9 wins and 1 loss. The extra game listed by The Georgetown Basketball History Project is an undated 47-19 victory against George Washington, listed as the last game of the 1918-19 season and one of three games Georgetown played against George Washington that season at a time when the schools apparently played two games against one another each season. For the following 1919-20 season, The Georgetown Basketball History Project and other sources agree that Georgetown finished with a 13-1 record, but the Project lists only 13 games (12 wins and 1 loss) played. It lists only one George Washington game in the 1919-20 season, but the media guide lists two, one of them an undated 47-19 Georgetown victory over George Washington that was the first game of the season. It appears that the Georgetown Basketball History Project is mistaken in showing the 47-19 win over George Washington as the last game of the 1918-19 season when it was in fact the first game of the 1919-20 season.)

It was common practice at this time for colleges and universities to include non-collegiate opponents in their schedules, with the games recognized as part of their official record for the season, so the two games against a United States Army team from Camp A. A. Humphreys, Virginia, counted as part of Georgetown's won-loss record for 1918-19. It was not until 1952, after the completion of the 1951-52 season, that the National Collegiate Athletic Association (NCAA) ruled that colleges and universities could no longer count games played against non-collegiate opponents in their annual won-loss records.

Date time, TV	Opponent	Result	Record	Site city, state
Regular Season
Fri., Jan. 10, 1919 no, no	Johns Hopkins	W 34–29	1-0	Ryan Gymnasium; Washington, DC
Tue., Jan. 14, 1919 no, no	Camp A. A. Humphreys	W 59–13	2-0	Ryan Gymnasium; Washington, DC
Wed., Jan. 22, 1919 no, no	at Navy	L 15–22	2-1	Dahlgren Hall; Annapolis, MD
Fri., Jan. 24, 1919 no, no	Randolph–Macon	W 39–14	3-1	Ryan Gymnasium; Washington, DC
Sat., Jan. 25, 1919 no, no	George Washington	W 32–15	4-1	Ryan Gymnasium; Washington, DC
Wed., Jan. 29, 1919 no, no	Gallaudet	W 48–22	5-1	Ryan Gymnasium; Washington, DC
Fri., Jan. 31, 1919 no, no	New York University	W 33–26	6-1	Ryan Gymnasium; Washington, DC
Wed., Feb. 5, 1919 no, no	at Gallaudet	cancelled		N/A; Washington, DC
Sat., Feb. 8, 1919 no, no	at George Washington	W 35–14	7-1	YMCA Hall; Washington, DC
Tue., Feb. 11, 1919 no, no	Virginia Tech	W 31–22	8-1	Ryan Gymnasium; Washington, DC
Sat., Feb. 15, 1919 no, no	Camp A. A. Humphreys	W 46–25	9-1	Ryan Gymnasium; Washington, DC
*Non-conference game. (#) Tournament seedings in parentheses.
