= 1918–19 Duquesne Dukes men's basketball team =

American college basketball season

1918–19 Duquesne Dukes men's basketball
- Conference: Independent
- Record: 4–6
- Head coach: Eugene McGuigan (5th season)
- Home arena: Duquesne Garden

1918–19 NCAA men's basketball independents standings
| | Conf. | | | | Overall |
| Team | W | | L | PCT | W | | L | PCT |
|---|---|---|---|---|---|---|---|---|
| Akron | | – | | – | 14 | – | 0 | 1.000 |
| Centre (KY) | | – | | – | 11 | – | 0 | 1.000 |
| The Citadel | | – | | – | 9 | – | 0 | 1.000 |
| Creighton | | – | | – | 14 | – | 0 | 1.000 |
| Louisiana State | | – | | – | 1 | – | 0 | 1.000 |
| Navy | | – | | – | 16 | – | 0 | 1.000 |
| Niagara | | – | | – | 1 | – | 0 | 1.000 |
| Oklahoma | | – | | – | 12 | – | 0 | 1.000 |
| Washington College | | – | | – | 1 | – | 0 | 1.000 |
| Santa Clara | | – | | – | 14 | – | 1 | .933 |
| Southwestern (KS) | | – | | – | 13 | – | 1 | .929 |
| Georgetown | | – | | – | 9 | – | 1 | .900 |
| Rhode Island State | | – | | – | 7 | – | 1 | .875 |
| Idaho | | – | | – | 13 | – | 2 | .867 |
| Beloit | | – | | – | 12 | – | 2 | .857 |
| Roanoke | | – | | – | 12 | – | 2 | .857 |
| Penn State | | – | | – | 11 | – | 2 | .846 |
| Toledo | | – | | – | 10 | – | 2 | .833 |
| Fordham | | – | | – | 24 | – | 5 | .828 |
| Virginia Tech | | – | | – | 18 | – | 4 | .818 |
| Bucknell | | – | | – | 13 | – | 3 | .813 |
| Denison | | – | | – | 13 | – | 3 | .813 |
| Syracuse | | – | | – | 13 | – | 3 | .813 |
| Delaware | | – | | – | 8 | – | 2 | .800 |
| DePauw | | – | | – | 12 | – | 3 | .800 |
| New Mexico A&M | | – | | – | 8 | – | 2 | .800 |
| Vanderbilt | | – | | – | 8 | – | 2 | .800 |
| North Carolina State | | – | | – | 11 | – | 3 | .786 |
| Utah | | – | | – | 7 | – | 2 | .778 |
| Wyoming | | – | | – | 7 | – | 2 | .778 |
| Washington and Lee | | – | | – | 10 | – | 3 | .769 |
| Wabash | | – | | – | 13 | – | 4 | .765 |
| Clemson | | – | | – | 3 | – | 1 | .750 |
| Lafayette | | – | | – | 12 | – | 4 | .750 |
| Millikin | | – | | – | 12 | – | 4 | .750 |
| Millsaps | | – | | – | 9 | – | 3 | .750 |
| North Dakota | | – | | – | 6 | – | 2 | .750 |
| Saint Francis (PA) | | – | | – | 9 | – | 3 | .750 |
| Virginia | | – | | – | 11 | – | 4 | .733 |
| Western State Normal | | – | | – | 11 | – | 4 | .733 |
| Carleton | | – | | – | 8 | – | 3 | .727 |
| Union (NY) | | – | | – | 8 | – | 3 | .727 |
| Michigan State Normal | | – | | – | 10 | – | 4 | .714 |
| Central Missouri | | – | | – | 14 | – | 6 | .700 |
| Washington & Jefferson | | – | | – | 7 | – | 3 | .700 |
| Colgate | | – | | – | 13 | – | 6 | .684 |
| Arizona | | – | | – | 6 | – | 3 | .667 |
| CCNY | | – | | – | 8 | – | 4 | .667 |
| Indiana State | | – | | – | 6 | – | 3 | .667 |
| Northern Arizona Normal | | – | | – | 4 | – | 2 | .667 |
| Rutgers | | – | | – | 6 | – | 3 | .667 |
| Tulane | | – | | – | 6 | – | 3 | .667 |
| Utah State | | – | | – | 6 | – | 3 | .667 |
| Washburn | | – | | – | 10 | – | 5 | .667 |
| Gettysburg | | – | | – | 9 | – | 5 | .643 |
| North Dakota Agricultural | | – | | – | 9 | – | 5 | .643 |
| Louisville | | – | | – | 7 | – | 4 | .636 |
| Mount Union | | – | | – | 7 | – | 4 | .636 |
| Brigham Young | | – | | – | 5 | – | 3 | .625 |
| Georgia | | – | | – | 5 | – | 3 | .625 |
| Tulsa | | – | | – | 5 | – | 3 | .625 |
| Buffalo | | – | | – | 8 | – | 5 | .615 |
| Lehigh | | – | | – | 8 | – | 5 | .615 |
| Stevens Institute | | – | | – | 8 | – | 5 | .615 |
| WPI | | – | | – | 8 | – | 5 | .615 |
| Miami (Ohio) | | – | | – | 7 | – | 5 | .583 |
| Auburn | | – | | – | 4 | – | 3 | .571 |
| Catholic | | – | | – | 4 | – | 3 | .571 |
| Marietta | | – | | – | 8 | – | 6 | .571 |
| Mississippi A&M | | – | | – | 4 | – | 3 | .571 |
| VMI | | – | | – | 8 | – | 6 | .571 |
| North Carolina | | – | | – | 9 | – | 7 | .563 |
| Ohio | | – | | – | 5 | – | 4 | .556 |
| Trinity (N.C.) | | – | | – | 6 | – | 5 | .545 |
| Franklin | | – | | – | 7 | – | 6 | .538 |
| Alabama | | – | | – | 3 | – | 3 | .500 |
| Kalamazoo | | – | | – | 7 | – | 7 | .500 |
| Michigan State | | – | | – | 9 | – | 9 | .500 |
| Oklahoma A&M | | – | | – | 5 | – | 5 | .500 |
| Pittsburgh | | – | | – | 7 | – | 7 | .500 |
| St. Joseph's | | – | | – | 3 | – | 3 | .500 |
| West Virginia | | – | | – | 8 | – | 8 | .500 |
| New York University | | – | | – | 5 | – | 6 | .455 |
| Swarthmore | | – | | – | 5 | – | 6 | .455 |
| Detroit | | – | | – | 4 | – | 5 | .444 |
| Dayton | | – | | – | 3 | – | 4 | .429 |
| Tempe Normal | | – | | – | 3 | – | 4 | .429 |
| Kentucky | | – | | – | 6 | – | 8 | .429 |
| Wooster | | – | | – | 6 | – | 8 | .429 |
| Bradley | | – | | – | 6 | – | 9 | .400 |
| Duquesne | | – | | – | 4 | – | 6 | .400 |
| Springfield (Mass.) | | – | | – | 4 | – | 6 | .400 |
| Texas Christian | | – | | – | 4 | – | 6 | .400 |
| Wake Forest | | – | | – | 6 | – | 9 | .400 |
| Muhlenberg | | – | | – | 7 | – | 11 | .389 |
| Nevada | | – | | – | 5 | – | 8 | .385 |
| Army | | – | | – | 3 | – | 5 | .375 |
| South Carolina | | – | | – | 4 | – | 7 | .364 |
| Northern Colorado | | – | | – | 5 | – | 9 | .357 |
| Davidson | | – | | – | 3 | – | 6 | .333 |
| Manhattan | | – | | – | 2 | – | 4 | .333 |
| Montana State | | – | | – | 1 | – | 2 | .333 |
| New Mexico | | – | | – | 2 | – | 4 | .333 |
| Saint Louis | | – | | – | 4 | – | 8 | .333 |
| Saint Mary's (CA) | | – | | – | 3 | – | 6 | .333 |
| Valparaiso | | – | | – | 1 | – | 2 | .333 |
| William & Mary | | – | | – | 3 | – | 6 | .333 |
| Bowling Green State | | – | | – | 2 | – | 5 | .286 |
| Marshall | | – | | – | 2 | – | 5 | .286 |
| Southern California | | – | | – | 3 | – | 8 | .273 |
| Grove City | | – | | – | 3 | – | 9 | .250 |
| Tennessee | | – | | – | 2 | – | 6 | .250 |
| Cincinnati | | – | | – | 3 | – | 11 | .214 |
| North Central | | – | | – | 3 | – | 11 | .214 |
| Notre Dame | | – | | – | 2 | – | 10 | .167 |
| Richmond | | – | | – | 1 | – | 5 | .167 |
| Brown | | – | | – | 2 | – | 12 | .143 |
| Fairmount | | – | | – | 1 | – | 7 | .125 |
| Connecticut | | – | | – | 1 | – | 8 | .111 |
| Butler | | – | | – | 1 | – | 9 | .100 |
| Ole Miss | | – | | – | 0 | – | 3 | .000 |
| St. John's (NY) | | – | | – | 0 | – | 7 | .000 |

The 1918–19 Duquesne Dukes men's basketball team represented Duquesne University during the 1918–19 college men's basketball season. The head coach was Eugene McGuigan coaching the Dukes in his fifth year. The team finished the season with an overall record of 4–6.

== Schedule ==
| Date time, TV | Opponent | Result | Record | Site city, state |
|---|---|---|---|---|
| January 10* | at Carnegie Tech | L 21–41 | 0–1 | Pittsburgh, PA |
| January 24* | at Wash. & Jeff. | L 23–40 | 0–2 | Washington, PA |
| January 28* | Westminster | W 49–41 | 1–2 | Duquesne Garden; Pittsburgh, PA |
| February 4* | Westinghouse Club | L 30–34 ^{OT} | 1–3 | Duquesne Garden; Pittsburgh, PA |
| February 7* | Waynesburg | W 64–25 | 2–3 | Duquesne Garden; Pittsburgh, PA |
| February 11* | Indiana Normal | L 41–42 | 2–4 | Duquesne Garden; Pittsburgh, PA |
| February 25* | at Indiana Normal | L 30–32 | 2–5 | |
| March 2* | at Westinghouse Club | L 19–29 | 2–6 | Duquesne Garden; Pittsburgh, PA |
| March 4* | Salem | W 59–17 | 3–6 | Duquesne Garden; Pittsburgh, PA |
| March 7* | Muskingham | W 43–35 | 4–6 | Duquesne Garden; Pittsburgh, PA |
*Non-conference game. (#) Tournament seedings in parentheses.
