= 1918–19 Connecticut Aggies men's basketball team =

American college basketball season

1918–19 Connecticut Aggies men's basketball
- Conference: Athletic League of New England State Colleges
- Record: 1–8 (0–4 ALNESC)
- Head coach: John F. Donahue (4th season)
- Home arena: Hawley Armory

The 1918–19 Connecticut Aggies men's basketball team represented Connecticut Agricultural College, now the University of Connecticut, in the 1918–19 collegiate men's basketball season. The Aggies completed the season with a 1–8 overall record. The Aggies were members of the Athletic League of New England State Colleges, where they ended the season with a 0–4 record. The Aggies played their home games at Hawley Armory in Storrs, Connecticut, and were led by fourth-year head coach John F. Donahue.

== Schedule ==
Date time, TV	Rank^{#}	Opponent^{#}	Result	Record	Site (attendance) city, state
Regular Season
*		Worcester Polytech	L 16–26	0–1	
		Rhode Island	L 18–30	0–2 (0–1)	
		New Hampshire	L 18–51	0–3 (0–2)	
		Rhode Island	L 46–49	0–4 (0–3)	
*		Boston College	W 46–27	1–4	
*		Stevens	L 31–45	1–5	
*		Boston College	L 20–42	1–6	
		New Hampshire	L 28–29	1–7 (0–4)	
*		Worcester Polytech	L 24–34	1–8	
*Non-conference game. ^{#}Rankings from AP Poll. (#) Tournament seedings in parentheses. All times are in Eastern Time.

Schedule Source:
