= 1913–14 North Carolina Tar Heels men's basketball team =

American college basketball season

1913–14 North Carolina Tar Heels men's basketball
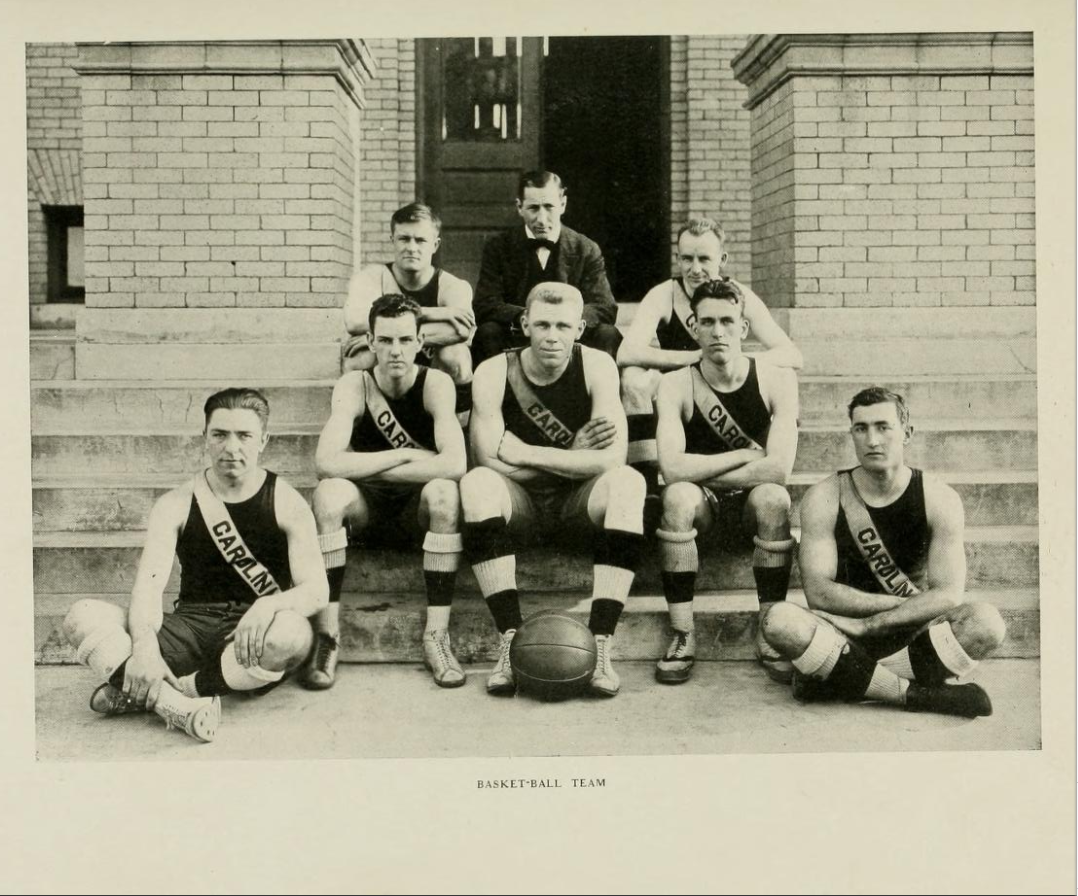
- Conference: Independent
- Record: 10–8
- Head coach: Nathaniel Cartmell (4th season)
- Captain: Meb Long
- Home arena: Bynum Gymnasium

1913–14 NCAA men's basketball independents standings
| | Conf. | | | | Overall |
| Team | W | | L | PCT | W | | L | PCT |
|---|---|---|---|---|---|---|---|---|
| California | | – | | – | 2 | – | 0 | 1.000 |
| Navy | | – | | – | 10 | – | 0 | 1.000 |
| Syracuse | | – | | – | 12 | – | 0 | 1.000 |
| Texas | | – | | – | 11 | – | 0 | 1.000 |
| Denison | | – | | – | 15 | – | 1 | .938 |
| Virginia | | – | | – | 12 | – | 1 | .923 |
| Grinnell | | – | | – | 10 | – | 1 | .909 |
| Nebraska Wesleyan | | – | | – | 19 | – | 2 | .905 |
| Georgia | | – | | – | 9 | – | 1 | .900 |
| Saint Mary's (Calif.) | | – | | – | 16 | – | 2 | .889 |
| Washington College | | – | | – | 8 | – | 1 | .889 |
| Tennessee | | – | | – | 15 | – | 2 | .882 |
| Oklahoma | | – | | – | 7 | – | 1 | .875 |
| Rochester (N.Y.) | | – | | – | 14 | – | 2 | .875 |
| Mississippi A&M | | – | | – | 13 | – | 2 | .867 |
| Utah | | – | | – | 13 | – | 2 | .867 |
| Kentucky | | – | | – | 12 | – | 2 | .857 |
| Lehigh | | – | | – | 12 | – | 2 | .857 |
| North Dakota Agricultural | | – | | – | 12 | – | 2 | .857 |
| The Citadel | | – | | – | 6 | – | 1 | .857 |
| Washington | | – | | – | 12 | – | 2 | .857 |
| Richmond | | – | | – | 5 | – | 1 | .833 |
| Seton Hall | | – | | – | 14 | – | 3 | .824 |
| Brigham Young | | – | | – | 8 | – | 2 | .800 |
| Central Missouri | | – | | – | 15 | – | 4 | .789 |
| Union (N.Y.) | | – | | – | 11 | – | 3 | .786 |
| Arizona | | – | | – | 7 | – | 2 | .778 |
| Duquesne | | – | | – | 7 | – | 2 | .778 |
| Kent State | | – | | – | 7 | – | 2 | .778 |
| Catholic | | – | | – | 13 | – | 4 | .765 |
| Millikin | | – | | – | 12 | – | 4 | .750 |
| Virginia Tech | | – | | – | 14 | – | 5 | .737 |
| Indiana State | | – | | – | 11 | – | 4 | .733 |
| Kalamazoo | | – | | – | 8 | – | 3 | .727 |
| Roanoke | | – | | – | 13 | – | 5 | .722 |
| Fordham | | – | | – | 20 | – | 8 | .714 |
| Swarthmore | | – | | – | 10 | – | 4 | .714 |
| Texas A&M | | – | | – | 5 | – | 2 | .714 |
| Utah State | | – | | – | 10 | – | 4 | .714 |
| Nevada | | – | | – | 7 | – | 3 | .700 |
| Oberlin | | – | | – | 7 | – | 3 | .700 |
| Washington & Jefferson | | – | | – | 7 | – | 3 | .700 |
| Niagara | | – | | – | 9 | – | 4 | .692 |
| Idaho | | – | | – | 11 | – | 5 | .688 |
| Notre Dame | | – | | – | 11 | – | 5 | .688 |
| Wabash | | – | | – | 11 | – | 5 | .688 |
| Carleton | | – | | – | 10 | – | 5 | .667 |
| Detroit | | – | | – | 6 | – | 3 | .667 |
| Michigan State | | – | | – | 8 | – | 4 | .667 |
| Montana State | | – | | – | 10 | – | 5 | .667 |
| Penn State | | – | | – | 8 | – | 4 | .667 |
| St. Joseph's | | – | | – | 10 | – | 5 | .667 |
| Tulane | | – | | – | 8 | – | 4 | .667 |
| Vanderbilt | | – | | – | 6 | – | 3 | .667 |
| Manhattan | | – | | – | 11 | – | 6 | .647 |
| Augustana (Ill.) | | – | | – | 9 | – | 5 | .643 |
| Canisius | | – | | – | 5 | – | 3 | .625 |
| Georgetown | | – | | – | 10 | – | 6 | .625 |
| Allegheny | | – | | – | 8 | – | 5 | .615 |
| Lake Forest | | – | | – | 8 | – | 5 | .615 |
| Grove City | | – | | – | 11 | – | 7 | .611 |
| Alabama | | – | | – | 6 | – | 4 | .600 |
| Rutgers | | – | | – | 3 | – | 2 | .600 |
| Tulsa | | – | | – | 3 | – | 2 | .600 |
| North Dakota | | – | | – | 10 | – | 7 | .588 |
| Wake Forest | | – | | – | 10 | – | 7 | .588 |
| Beloit | | – | | – | 7 | – | 5 | .583 |
| Louisiana State | | – | | – | 7 | – | 5 | .583 |
| Stanford | | – | | – | 7 | – | 5 | .583 |
| Washington and Lee | | – | | – | 7 | – | 5 | .583 |
| Trinity (N.C.) | | – | | – | 12 | – | 9 | .571 |
| Washington State | | – | | – | 13 | – | 10 | .565 |
| Dayton | | – | | – | 5 | – | 4 | .556 |
| North Carolina | | – | | – | 10 | – | 8 | .556 |
| Oregon Agricultural | | – | | – | 10 | – | 8 | .556 |
| South Carolina | | – | | – | 5 | – | 4 | .556 |
| Tempe Normal | | – | | – | 6 | – | 5 | .545 |
| CCNY | | – | | – | 6 | – | 5 | .545 |
| Mount Union | | – | | – | 6 | – | 5 | .545 |
| Miami (Ohio) | | – | | – | 7 | – | 6 | .538 |
| Southwestern (Kan.) | | – | | – | 7 | – | 6 | .538 |
| Ole Miss | | – | | – | 8 | – | 7 | .533 |
| Fairmount | | – | | – | 8 | – | 7 | .533 |
| Akron | | – | | – | 6 | – | 6 | .500 |
| Bradley | | – | | – | 10 | – | 10 | .500 |
| Gettysburg | | – | | – | 9 | – | 9 | .500 |
| Springfield (Mass.) | | – | | – | 6 | – | 6 | .500 |
| Washburn | | – | | – | 8 | – | 8 | .500 |
| Western State Normal | | – | | – | 4 | – | 4 | .500 |
| Wisconsin–Stevens Point | | – | | – | 7 | – | 7 | .500 |
| Pittsburgh | | – | | – | 7 | – | 8 | .467 |
| North Carolina State | | – | | – | 6 | – | 7 | .462 |
| Franklin | | – | | – | 6 | – | 8 | .429 |
| Army | | – | | – | 5 | – | 7 | .417 |
| Lafayette | | – | | – | 5 | – | 7 | .417 |
| Loyola (Md.) | | – | | – | 5 | – | 7 | .417 |
| Southern California | | – | | – | 5 | – | 7 | .417 |
| Temple | | – | | – | 5 | – | 7 | .417 |
| New York University | | – | | – | 6 | – | 9 | .400 |
| St. Lawrence | | – | | – | 6 | – | 9 | .400 |
| St. John's (N.Y.) | | – | | – | 7 | – | 11 | .389 |
| VMI | | – | | – | 4 | – | 7 | .364 |
| Oregon | | – | | – | 6 | – | 11 | .353 |
| Bucknell | | – | | – | 4 | – | 8 | .333 |
| Delaware | | – | | – | 3 | – | 6 | .333 |
| Marietta | | – | | – | 4 | – | 8 | .333 |
| Northern Colorado | | – | | – | 1 | – | 2 | .333 |
| Santa Clara | | – | | – | 2 | – | 4 | .333 |
| William & Mary | | – | | – | 3 | – | 6 | .333 |
| Muhlenberg | | – | | – | 4 | – | 10 | .286 |
| Clemson | | – | | – | 1 | – | 3 | .250 |
| Louisville | | – | | – | 2 | – | 6 | .250 |
| Wyoming | | – | | – | 1 | – | 3 | .250 |
| Auburn | | – | | – | 3 | – | 10 | .231 |
| Ohio | | – | | – | 3 | – | 10 | .231 |
| George Washington | | – | | – | 3 | – | 11 | .214 |
| Cincinnati | | – | | – | 2 | – | 8 | .200 |
| Colgate | | – | | – | 3 | – | 12 | .200 |
| Montana | | – | | – | 2 | – | 9 | .182 |
| TCU | | – | | – | 2 | – | 9 | .182 |
| Baylor | | – | | – | 1 | – | 8 | .111 |
| Millsaps | | – | | – | 0 | – | 8 | .000 |
| New Mexico | | – | | – | 0 | – | 1 | .000 |
| Wooster | | – | | – | 0 | – | 13 | .000 |

The 1913–14 North Carolina Tar Heels men's basketball team (variously "North Carolina", "Carolina" or "Tar Heels") was the fourth varsity college basketball team to represent the University of North Carolina. (Note: The school was known as the University of North Carolina until February 1963.)

== Roster and schedule ==
Practice for the upcoming season, along with try-outs, was scheduled to start in November. Meb Long was announced as captain for the team. The Tar Heel reported that practices typically last around two hours, including time for dressing and showering. Long put together a preliminary schedule that was published by The Tar Heel on December 11. The schedule included fourteen games, three of which were to happen before the new year. The schedule included a game in Raleigh against University of Georgia, Virginia Agricultural and Mechanical College and Polytechnic Institute (V.P.I.), and the University of Virginia, among others. In advance of the first game, the team was practicing every day. A writer for The Tar Heel that the talent for the upcoming season was the best there had been since basketball started in 1910–11. Coach Nathaniel Cartmell felt that the team would "clean up everybody" the team faced.

1913–14 North Carolina Tar Heels roster
| Name | Position |
|---|---|
| Ezra Andrews | |
| Lenoir Chambers | G |
| Rusty Davis | |
| Carey Dowd | |
| Ben Edwards | C |
| Charles Fleming | |
| Robert Goodson | |
| Roy Homewood | |
| John Johnson | C, G |
| Cy Long | |
| Meb Long | F |
| James Pou | |
| Raby Tennent | |
| George Tandy | C |

Schedule
| Date time, TV | Opponent | Result | Record | Site city, state |
Regular season
| December 13, 1913* | Elon College | L 15–21 | 0–1 | Bynum Gymnasium; Chapel Hill, North Carolina |
| December 16, 1913* | Durham Y.M.C.A. | W 37–24 | 1–1 | Bynum Gymnasium; Chapel Hill, North Carolina |
| December 29, 1913* | at Charlotte Y.M.C.A. | W 43–32 | 2–1 | Charlotte, North Carolina |
| December 30, 1913* | at Charlotte Y.M.C.A. | W 53–29 | 3–1 | Charlotte, North Carolina |
| January 14, 1914* | at Durham Y.M.C.A. | L 37–42 | 3–2 | Raleigh, North Carolina |
| January 30, 1914* | at Guilford College | W 23–22 ^{OT} | 4–2 | |
| January 31, 1914* | at Elon College | W 29–16 | 5–2 | |
| February 6, 1914* | Wake Forest | W 29–9 | 6–2 | Bynum Gymnasium; Chapel Hill, North Carolina |
| February 9, 1914* | vs. Virginia | L 27–67 | 6–3 | Raleigh, North Carolina |
| February 13, 1914* | at Wake Forest | L 30–39 | 6–4 | Wake Forest, North Carolina |
| February 16, 1914* | vs. Durham Y.M.C.A. | W 44–28 | 7–4 | Raleigh, North Carolina |
| February 19, 1914* | Guilford College | W 38–13 | 8–4 | Bynum Gymnasium; Chapel Hill, North Carolina |
| February 23, 1914* | vs. Wake Forest | L 29–32 | 8–5 | Raleigh, North Carolina |
| February 27, 1914* | at Woodberry Forest | W 25–21 | 9–5 | Orange, Virginia |
| February 28, 1914* | at Virginia Military Institute | L 29–37 | 9–6 | Lexington, Virginia |
| March 2, 1914* | at Staunton Military Academy | W 41–10 | 10–6 | Staunton, Virginia |
| March 3, 1914* | at Lynchburg Y.M.C.A. | L 34–42 | 10–7 | |
| March 4, 1914* | at Virginia | L 23–56 | 10–8 | Fayerweather Gymnasium; Charlottesville, Virginia |
*Non-conference game. ^{#}Rankings from AP Poll. (#) Tournament seedings in parentheses. All times are in Eastern Time.
