= 1913–14 Colgate men's basketball team =

American college basketball season

1913–14 Colgate Raiders men's basketball
- Conference: Independent
- Record: 3–12
- Head coach: Walt Hammond (1st season)
- Captain: Ellery Huntington Jr.
- Home arena: none

1913–14 NCAA men's basketball independents standings
| | Conf. | | | | Overall |
| Team | W | | L | PCT | W | | L | PCT |
|---|---|---|---|---|---|---|---|---|
| California | | – | | – | 2 | – | 0 | 1.000 |
| Navy | | – | | – | 10 | – | 0 | 1.000 |
| Syracuse | | – | | – | 12 | – | 0 | 1.000 |
| Texas | | – | | – | 11 | – | 0 | 1.000 |
| Denison | | – | | – | 15 | – | 1 | .938 |
| Virginia | | – | | – | 12 | – | 1 | .923 |
| Grinnell | | – | | – | 10 | – | 1 | .909 |
| Nebraska Wesleyan | | – | | – | 19 | – | 2 | .905 |
| Georgia | | – | | – | 9 | – | 1 | .900 |
| Saint Mary's (Calif.) | | – | | – | 16 | – | 2 | .889 |
| Washington College | | – | | – | 8 | – | 1 | .889 |
| Tennessee | | – | | – | 15 | – | 2 | .882 |
| Oklahoma | | – | | – | 7 | – | 1 | .875 |
| Rochester (N.Y.) | | – | | – | 14 | – | 2 | .875 |
| Mississippi A&M | | – | | – | 13 | – | 2 | .867 |
| Utah | | – | | – | 13 | – | 2 | .867 |
| Kentucky | | – | | – | 12 | – | 2 | .857 |
| Lehigh | | – | | – | 12 | – | 2 | .857 |
| North Dakota Agricultural | | – | | – | 12 | – | 2 | .857 |
| The Citadel | | – | | – | 6 | – | 1 | .857 |
| Washington | | – | | – | 12 | – | 2 | .857 |
| Richmond | | – | | – | 5 | – | 1 | .833 |
| Seton Hall | | – | | – | 14 | – | 3 | .824 |
| Brigham Young | | – | | – | 8 | – | 2 | .800 |
| Central Missouri | | – | | – | 15 | – | 4 | .789 |
| Union (N.Y.) | | – | | – | 11 | – | 3 | .786 |
| Arizona | | – | | – | 7 | – | 2 | .778 |
| Duquesne | | – | | – | 7 | – | 2 | .778 |
| Kent State | | – | | – | 7 | – | 2 | .778 |
| Catholic | | – | | – | 13 | – | 4 | .765 |
| Millikin | | – | | – | 12 | – | 4 | .750 |
| Virginia Tech | | – | | – | 14 | – | 5 | .737 |
| Indiana State | | – | | – | 11 | – | 4 | .733 |
| Kalamazoo | | – | | – | 8 | – | 3 | .727 |
| Roanoke | | – | | – | 13 | – | 5 | .722 |
| Fordham | | – | | – | 20 | – | 8 | .714 |
| Swarthmore | | – | | – | 10 | – | 4 | .714 |
| Texas A&M | | – | | – | 5 | – | 2 | .714 |
| Utah State | | – | | – | 10 | – | 4 | .714 |
| Nevada | | – | | – | 7 | – | 3 | .700 |
| Oberlin | | – | | – | 7 | – | 3 | .700 |
| Washington & Jefferson | | – | | – | 7 | – | 3 | .700 |
| Niagara | | – | | – | 9 | – | 4 | .692 |
| Idaho | | – | | – | 11 | – | 5 | .688 |
| Notre Dame | | – | | – | 11 | – | 5 | .688 |
| Wabash | | – | | – | 11 | – | 5 | .688 |
| Carleton | | – | | – | 10 | – | 5 | .667 |
| Detroit | | – | | – | 6 | – | 3 | .667 |
| Michigan State | | – | | – | 8 | – | 4 | .667 |
| Montana State | | – | | – | 10 | – | 5 | .667 |
| Penn State | | – | | – | 8 | – | 4 | .667 |
| St. Joseph's | | – | | – | 10 | – | 5 | .667 |
| Tulane | | – | | – | 8 | – | 4 | .667 |
| Vanderbilt | | – | | – | 6 | – | 3 | .667 |
| Manhattan | | – | | – | 11 | – | 6 | .647 |
| Augustana (Ill.) | | – | | – | 9 | – | 5 | .643 |
| Canisius | | – | | – | 5 | – | 3 | .625 |
| Georgetown | | – | | – | 10 | – | 6 | .625 |
| Allegheny | | – | | – | 8 | – | 5 | .615 |
| Lake Forest | | – | | – | 8 | – | 5 | .615 |
| Grove City | | – | | – | 11 | – | 7 | .611 |
| Alabama | | – | | – | 6 | – | 4 | .600 |
| Rutgers | | – | | – | 3 | – | 2 | .600 |
| Tulsa | | – | | – | 3 | – | 2 | .600 |
| North Dakota | | – | | – | 10 | – | 7 | .588 |
| Wake Forest | | – | | – | 10 | – | 7 | .588 |
| Beloit | | – | | – | 7 | – | 5 | .583 |
| Louisiana State | | – | | – | 7 | – | 5 | .583 |
| Stanford | | – | | – | 7 | – | 5 | .583 |
| Washington and Lee | | – | | – | 7 | – | 5 | .583 |
| Trinity (N.C.) | | – | | – | 12 | – | 9 | .571 |
| Washington State | | – | | – | 13 | – | 10 | .565 |
| Dayton | | – | | – | 5 | – | 4 | .556 |
| North Carolina | | – | | – | 10 | – | 8 | .556 |
| Oregon Agricultural | | – | | – | 10 | – | 8 | .556 |
| South Carolina | | – | | – | 5 | – | 4 | .556 |
| Tempe Normal | | – | | – | 6 | – | 5 | .545 |
| CCNY | | – | | – | 6 | – | 5 | .545 |
| Mount Union | | – | | – | 6 | – | 5 | .545 |
| Miami (Ohio) | | – | | – | 7 | – | 6 | .538 |
| Southwestern (Kan.) | | – | | – | 7 | – | 6 | .538 |
| Ole Miss | | – | | – | 8 | – | 7 | .533 |
| Fairmount | | – | | – | 8 | – | 7 | .533 |
| Akron | | – | | – | 6 | – | 6 | .500 |
| Bradley | | – | | – | 10 | – | 10 | .500 |
| Gettysburg | | – | | – | 9 | – | 9 | .500 |
| Springfield (Mass.) | | – | | – | 6 | – | 6 | .500 |
| Washburn | | – | | – | 8 | – | 8 | .500 |
| Western State Normal | | – | | – | 4 | – | 4 | .500 |
| Wisconsin–Stevens Point | | – | | – | 7 | – | 7 | .500 |
| Pittsburgh | | – | | – | 7 | – | 8 | .467 |
| North Carolina State | | – | | – | 6 | – | 7 | .462 |
| Franklin | | – | | – | 6 | – | 8 | .429 |
| Army | | – | | – | 5 | – | 7 | .417 |
| Lafayette | | – | | – | 5 | – | 7 | .417 |
| Loyola (Md.) | | – | | – | 5 | – | 7 | .417 |
| Southern California | | – | | – | 5 | – | 7 | .417 |
| Temple | | – | | – | 5 | – | 7 | .417 |
| New York University | | – | | – | 6 | – | 9 | .400 |
| St. Lawrence | | – | | – | 6 | – | 9 | .400 |
| St. John's (N.Y.) | | – | | – | 7 | – | 11 | .389 |
| VMI | | – | | – | 4 | – | 7 | .364 |
| Oregon | | – | | – | 6 | – | 11 | .353 |
| Bucknell | | – | | – | 4 | – | 8 | .333 |
| Delaware | | – | | – | 3 | – | 6 | .333 |
| Marietta | | – | | – | 4 | – | 8 | .333 |
| Northern Colorado | | – | | – | 1 | – | 2 | .333 |
| Santa Clara | | – | | – | 2 | – | 4 | .333 |
| William & Mary | | – | | – | 3 | – | 6 | .333 |
| Muhlenberg | | – | | – | 4 | – | 10 | .286 |
| Clemson | | – | | – | 1 | – | 3 | .250 |
| Louisville | | – | | – | 2 | – | 6 | .250 |
| Wyoming | | – | | – | 1 | – | 3 | .250 |
| Auburn | | – | | – | 3 | – | 10 | .231 |
| Ohio | | – | | – | 3 | – | 10 | .231 |
| George Washington | | – | | – | 3 | – | 11 | .214 |
| Cincinnati | | – | | – | 2 | – | 8 | .200 |
| Colgate | | – | | – | 3 | – | 12 | .200 |
| Montana | | – | | – | 2 | – | 9 | .182 |
| TCU | | – | | – | 2 | – | 9 | .182 |
| Baylor | | – | | – | 1 | – | 8 | .111 |
| Millsaps | | – | | – | 0 | – | 8 | .000 |
| New Mexico | | – | | – | 0 | – | 1 | .000 |
| Wooster | | – | | – | 0 | – | 13 | .000 |

The 1913–14 Colgate Raiders men's basketball team represented Colgate University during the 1913–14 college men's basketball season. The head coach was Walt Hammond, coaching the Raiders in his first season. The team had finished with a final record of 3–12. The team captain was Walt Hammond.

== Schedule ==
| Date time, TV | Opponent | Result | Record | Site city, state |
|---|---|---|---|---|
| * | Swarthmore | L 23–28 | 0–1 | Hamilton, NY |
| * | at Springfield YMCA | W 26–24 | 1–1 | |
| * | at Wesleyan | L 19–24 | 1–2 | |
| * | Rochester | L 09–43 | 1–3 | Hamilton, NY |
| * | at Williams | L 21–30 | 1–4 | Williamstown, MA |
| * | RPI | W 42–25 | 2–4 | Hamilton, NY |
| * | Union | L 11–20 | 2–5 | Hamilton, NY |
| * | at Rochester | L 11–21 | 2–6 | Rochester, NY |
| * | Syracuse | L 28–29 ^{OT} | 2–7 | Hamilton, NY |
| * | Notre Dame | L 26–31 | 2–8 | Hamilton, NY |
| * | at Syracuse | L 19–27 | 2–9 | Archbold Gymnasium; Syracuse, NY |
| * | Springfield YMCA | L 27–30 | 2–10 | Hamilton, NY |
| * | at Williams | L 23–25 ^{OT} | 2–11 | Williamstown, MA |
| * | Wesleyan | W 23–18 | 3–11 | Hamilton, NY |
| * | at Union | L 18–28 | 3–12 | |
*Non-conference game. (#) Tournament seedings in parentheses.
