= 1913–14 Tennessee Volunteers basketball team =

American college basketball season

1913–14 Tennessee Volunteers basketball
- Conference: Independent
- Record: 15–2
- Head coach: Zora Clevenger (2nd season)
- Captain: Victor H. Klein
- Home arena: none

1913–14 NCAA men's basketball independents standings
	Conf.				Overall
Team	W		L	PCT	W		L	PCT
California		–		–	2	–	0	1.000
Navy		–		–	10	–	0	1.000
Syracuse		–		–	12	–	0	1.000
Texas		–		–	11	–	0	1.000
Denison		–		–	15	–	1	.938
Virginia		–		–	12	–	1	.923
Grinnell		–		–	10	–	1	.909
Nebraska Wesleyan		–		–	19	–	2	.905
Georgia		–		–	9	–	1	.900
Saint Mary's (Calif.)		–		–	16	–	2	.889
Washington College		–		–	8	–	1	.889
Tennessee		–		–	15	–	2	.882
Oklahoma		–		–	7	–	1	.875
Rochester (N.Y.)		–		–	14	–	2	.875
Mississippi A&M		–		–	13	–	2	.867
Utah		–		–	13	–	2	.867
Kentucky		–		–	12	–	2	.857
Lehigh		–		–	12	–	2	.857
North Dakota Agricultural		–		–	12	–	2	.857
The Citadel		–		–	6	–	1	.857
Washington		–		–	12	–	2	.857
Richmond		–		–	5	–	1	.833
Seton Hall		–		–	14	–	3	.824
Brigham Young		–		–	8	–	2	.800
Central Missouri		–		–	15	–	4	.789
Union (N.Y.)		–		–	11	–	3	.786
Arizona		–		–	7	–	2	.778
Duquesne		–		–	7	–	2	.778
Kent State		–		–	7	–	2	.778
Catholic		–		–	13	–	4	.765
Millikin		–		–	12	–	4	.750
Virginia Tech		–		–	14	–	5	.737
Indiana State		–		–	11	–	4	.733
Kalamazoo		–		–	8	–	3	.727
Roanoke		–		–	13	–	5	.722
Fordham		–		–	20	–	8	.714
Swarthmore		–		–	10	–	4	.714
Texas A&M		–		–	5	–	2	.714
Utah State		–		–	10	–	4	.714
Nevada		–		–	7	–	3	.700
Oberlin		–		–	7	–	3	.700
Washington & Jefferson		–		–	7	–	3	.700
Niagara		–		–	9	–	4	.692
Idaho		–		–	11	–	5	.688
Notre Dame		–		–	11	–	5	.688
Wabash		–		–	11	–	5	.688
Carleton		–		–	10	–	5	.667
Detroit		–		–	6	–	3	.667
Michigan State		–		–	8	–	4	.667
Montana State		–		–	10	–	5	.667
Penn State		–		–	8	–	4	.667
St. Joseph's		–		–	10	–	5	.667
Tulane		–		–	8	–	4	.667
Vanderbilt		–		–	6	–	3	.667
Manhattan		–		–	11	–	6	.647
Augustana (Ill.)		–		–	9	–	5	.643
Canisius		–		–	5	–	3	.625
Georgetown		–		–	10	–	6	.625
Allegheny		–		–	8	–	5	.615
Lake Forest		–		–	8	–	5	.615
Grove City		–		–	11	–	7	.611
Alabama		–		–	6	–	4	.600
Rutgers		–		–	3	–	2	.600
Tulsa		–		–	3	–	2	.600
North Dakota		–		–	10	–	7	.588
Wake Forest		–		–	10	–	7	.588
Beloit		–		–	7	–	5	.583
Louisiana State		–		–	7	–	5	.583
Stanford		–		–	7	–	5	.583
Washington and Lee		–		–	7	–	5	.583
Trinity (N.C.)		–		–	12	–	9	.571
Washington State		–		–	13	–	10	.565
Dayton		–		–	5	–	4	.556
North Carolina		–		–	10	–	8	.556
Oregon Agricultural		–		–	10	–	8	.556
South Carolina		–		–	5	–	4	.556
Tempe Normal		–		–	6	–	5	.545
CCNY		–		–	6	–	5	.545
Mount Union		–		–	6	–	5	.545
Miami (Ohio)		–		–	7	–	6	.538
Southwestern (Kan.)		–		–	7	–	6	.538
Ole Miss		–		–	8	–	7	.533
Fairmount		–		–	8	–	7	.533
Akron		–		–	6	–	6	.500
Bradley		–		–	10	–	10	.500
Gettysburg		–		–	9	–	9	.500
Springfield (Mass.)		–		–	6	–	6	.500
Washburn		–		–	8	–	8	.500
Western State Normal		–		–	4	–	4	.500
Wisconsin–Stevens Point		–		–	7	–	7	.500
Pittsburgh		–		–	7	–	8	.467
North Carolina State		–		–	6	–	7	.462
Franklin		–		–	6	–	8	.429
Army		–		–	5	–	7	.417
Lafayette		–		–	5	–	7	.417
Loyola (Md.)		–		–	5	–	7	.417
Southern California		–		–	5	–	7	.417
Temple		–		–	5	–	7	.417
New York University		–		–	6	–	9	.400
St. Lawrence		–		–	6	–	9	.400
St. John's (N.Y.)		–		–	7	–	11	.389
VMI		–		–	4	–	7	.364
Oregon		–		–	6	–	11	.353
Bucknell		–		–	4	–	8	.333
Delaware		–		–	3	–	6	.333
Marietta		–		–	4	–	8	.333
Northern Colorado		–		–	1	–	2	.333
Santa Clara		–		–	2	–	4	.333
William & Mary		–		–	3	–	6	.333
Muhlenberg		–		–	4	–	10	.286
Clemson		–		–	1	–	3	.250
Louisville		–		–	2	–	6	.250
Wyoming		–		–	1	–	3	.250
Auburn		–		–	3	–	10	.231
Ohio		–		–	3	–	10	.231
George Washington		–		–	3	–	11	.214
Cincinnati		–		–	2	–	8	.200
Colgate		–		–	3	–	12	.200
Montana		–		–	2	–	9	.182
TCU		–		–	2	–	9	.182
Baylor		–		–	1	–	8	.111
Millsaps		–		–	0	–	8	.000
New Mexico		–		–	0	–	1	.000
Wooster		–		–	0	–	13	.000

The 1913–14 Tennessee Volunteers basketball team represented the University of Tennessee during the 1913–14 college men's basketball season. The head coach was Zora Clevenger, coaching the team in his second season. The Volunteers team captain was Victor H. Klein.

== Schedule ==
Date time, TV	Opponent	Result	Record	Site city, state
December 7, 1913*	Johnson Bible College	W 45–17	1–0	Knoxville, TN
December 12, 1913*	Carson Newman	W 58–13	2–0	Knoxville, TN
January 17, 1914*	at Maryville	W 49–16	3–0	Maryville, TN
February 1, 1914*	at S. Chattanooga YMCA	W 24–18	4–0	Chattanooga, TN
February 3, 1914*	Knoxville High School	W 52–18	5–0	Knoxville, TN
February 6, 1914*	Alabama	W 49–13	6–0	Knoxville, TN
February 7, 1914*	Alabama	W 22–21	7–0	Knoxville, TN
February 9, 1914*	at Cumberland College	W 32–22	8–0	Williamsburg, KY
February 10, 1913*	at Union College	W 41–12	9–0	Founders Hall; Barbourville, KY
February 11, 1914*	at Kentucky	L 14–20	9–1	Buell Armory Gymnasium; Lexington, KY
February 12, 1914*	at Kentucky	L 18–20	9–2	Buell Armory Gymnasium; Lexington, KY
February 13, 1914*	at Louisville YMCA	W 31–30	10–2	Louisville, KY
February 14, 1914*	at Louisville	W 32–17	11–2	Louisville, KY
February 18, 1914*	Chattanooga	W 32–7	13–2	Knoxville, TN
February 21, 1914*	Maryville	W 36–15	10–5	Knoxville, TN
February 23, 1914*	at Maryville	W 40–19	11–5	Maryville, TN
February 28, 1914*	at Chattanooga	W 34–18	15–2	Chattanooga, TN
*Non-conference game. (#) Tournament seedings in parentheses.
