= 1913–14 Georgetown Hoyas men's basketball team =

American college basketball season

1913–14 Georgetown Hoyas men's basketball
- Conference: Independent
- Record: 10–6
- Head coach: James Colliflower (3rd season)
- Captain: Ronayne "Roy" Waldron
- Home arena: Arcade Rink

1913–14 NCAA men's basketball independents standings
	Conf.				Overall
Team	W		L	PCT	W		L	PCT
California		–		–	2	–	0	1.000
Navy		–		–	10	–	0	1.000
Syracuse		–		–	12	–	0	1.000
Texas		–		–	11	–	0	1.000
Denison		–		–	15	–	1	.938
Virginia		–		–	12	–	1	.923
Grinnell		–		–	10	–	1	.909
Nebraska Wesleyan		–		–	19	–	2	.905
Georgia		–		–	9	–	1	.900
Saint Mary's (Calif.)		–		–	16	–	2	.889
Washington College		–		–	8	–	1	.889
Tennessee		–		–	15	–	2	.882
Oklahoma		–		–	7	–	1	.875
Rochester (N.Y.)		–		–	14	–	2	.875
Mississippi A&M		–		–	13	–	2	.867
Utah		–		–	13	–	2	.867
Kentucky		–		–	12	–	2	.857
Lehigh		–		–	12	–	2	.857
North Dakota Agricultural		–		–	12	–	2	.857
The Citadel		–		–	6	–	1	.857
Washington		–		–	12	–	2	.857
Richmond		–		–	5	–	1	.833
Seton Hall		–		–	14	–	3	.824
Brigham Young		–		–	8	–	2	.800
Central Missouri		–		–	15	–	4	.789
Union (N.Y.)		–		–	11	–	3	.786
Arizona		–		–	7	–	2	.778
Duquesne		–		–	7	–	2	.778
Kent State		–		–	7	–	2	.778
Catholic		–		–	13	–	4	.765
Millikin		–		–	12	–	4	.750
Virginia Tech		–		–	14	–	5	.737
Indiana State		–		–	11	–	4	.733
Kalamazoo		–		–	8	–	3	.727
Roanoke		–		–	13	–	5	.722
Fordham		–		–	20	–	8	.714
Swarthmore		–		–	10	–	4	.714
Texas A&M		–		–	5	–	2	.714
Utah State		–		–	10	–	4	.714
Nevada		–		–	7	–	3	.700
Oberlin		–		–	7	–	3	.700
Washington & Jefferson		–		–	7	–	3	.700
Niagara		–		–	9	–	4	.692
Idaho		–		–	11	–	5	.688
Notre Dame		–		–	11	–	5	.688
Wabash		–		–	11	–	5	.688
Carleton		–		–	10	–	5	.667
Detroit		–		–	6	–	3	.667
Michigan State		–		–	8	–	4	.667
Montana State		–		–	10	–	5	.667
Penn State		–		–	8	–	4	.667
St. Joseph's		–		–	10	–	5	.667
Tulane		–		–	8	–	4	.667
Vanderbilt		–		–	6	–	3	.667
Manhattan		–		–	11	–	6	.647
Augustana (Ill.)		–		–	9	–	5	.643
Canisius		–		–	5	–	3	.625
Georgetown		–		–	10	–	6	.625
Allegheny		–		–	8	–	5	.615
Lake Forest		–		–	8	–	5	.615
Grove City		–		–	11	–	7	.611
Alabama		–		–	6	–	4	.600
Rutgers		–		–	3	–	2	.600
Tulsa		–		–	3	–	2	.600
North Dakota		–		–	10	–	7	.588
Wake Forest		–		–	10	–	7	.588
Beloit		–		–	7	–	5	.583
Louisiana State		–		–	7	–	5	.583
Stanford		–		–	7	–	5	.583
Washington and Lee		–		–	7	–	5	.583
Trinity (N.C.)		–		–	12	–	9	.571
Washington State		–		–	13	–	10	.565
Dayton		–		–	5	–	4	.556
North Carolina		–		–	10	–	8	.556
Oregon Agricultural		–		–	10	–	8	.556
South Carolina		–		–	5	–	4	.556
Tempe Normal		–		–	6	–	5	.545
CCNY		–		–	6	–	5	.545
Mount Union		–		–	6	–	5	.545
Miami (Ohio)		–		–	7	–	6	.538
Southwestern (Kan.)		–		–	7	–	6	.538
Ole Miss		–		–	8	–	7	.533
Fairmount		–		–	8	–	7	.533
Akron		–		–	6	–	6	.500
Bradley		–		–	10	–	10	.500
Gettysburg		–		–	9	–	9	.500
Springfield (Mass.)		–		–	6	–	6	.500
Washburn		–		–	8	–	8	.500
Western State Normal		–		–	4	–	4	.500
Wisconsin–Stevens Point		–		–	7	–	7	.500
Pittsburgh		–		–	7	–	8	.467
North Carolina State		–		–	6	–	7	.462
Franklin		–		–	6	–	8	.429
Army		–		–	5	–	7	.417
Lafayette		–		–	5	–	7	.417
Loyola (Md.)		–		–	5	–	7	.417
Southern California		–		–	5	–	7	.417
Temple		–		–	5	–	7	.417
New York University		–		–	6	–	9	.400
St. Lawrence		–		–	6	–	9	.400
St. John's (N.Y.)		–		–	7	–	11	.389
VMI		–		–	4	–	7	.364
Oregon		–		–	6	–	11	.353
Bucknell		–		–	4	–	8	.333
Delaware		–		–	3	–	6	.333
Marietta		–		–	4	–	8	.333
Northern Colorado		–		–	1	–	2	.333
Santa Clara		–		–	2	–	4	.333
William & Mary		–		–	3	–	6	.333
Muhlenberg		–		–	4	–	10	.286
Clemson		–		–	1	–	3	.250
Louisville		–		–	2	–	6	.250
Wyoming		–		–	1	–	3	.250
Auburn		–		–	3	–	10	.231
Ohio		–		–	3	–	10	.231
George Washington		–		–	3	–	11	.214
Cincinnati		–		–	2	–	8	.200
Colgate		–		–	3	–	12	.200
Montana		–		–	2	–	9	.182
TCU		–		–	2	–	9	.182
Baylor		–		–	1	–	8	.111
Millsaps		–		–	0	–	8	.000
New Mexico		–		–	0	–	1	.000
Wooster		–		–	0	–	13	.000

The 1913–1914 team photo.

The 1913–14 Georgetown Hoyas men's basketball team represented Georgetown University during the 1913–14 NCAA college basketball season. James Colliflower coached the team in his third season as head coach. Georgetown was an independent and played its home games at the Arcade Rink, also known as the Arcadia and as the Arcade Auditorium, in Washington, D.C., and finished the season with a record of 10–6.

== Season recap ==
Senior forward Ronayne "Roy" Waldron was the team captain for the second straight season, a rare honor and the first player so honored in school history. Also, for the second straight year, he led the team in scoring; playing in 11 games and starting each of the 11, he scored a total of 79 points, averaging 7.2 points per game. He ended his collegiate career having played in 42 games and started 33 times, scoring 326 points and averaging 7.8 points per game, and he ranks third in scoring among Georgetown players who played between the 1906–07 and 1919–20 seasons. During his four seasons with the team, the Hoyas never had a losing season and were 35–5 on their home court.

Colliflower had coached the Hoyas for three seasons, posting an overall record of 32–17 and shepherding the men's basketball program through disputes over it between the undergraduate campus and the Law School. A part-time coach who made ends meet by attending to his coal delivery business, he stepped down as coach and returned to that business after this season when Georgetown hired John O'Reilly to succeed him as a full-time head coach. When O'Reilly later fell ill and could not coach, Colliflower returned to serve as head coach without pay during the 1921–22 season.

The Hoyas began to play their home games at Ryan Gymnasium the following season, so this was the last Georgetown men's basketball team to play its home games off campus until the team left Ryan to return to the Arcade Rink for the 1927–28 season.

== Roster ==
Georgetown players did not wear numbers on their jerseys this season. The first numbered jerseys in Georgetown men's basketball history would not appear until the 1933–34 season.

Name	Height	Weight (lbs.)	Position	Class	Hometown	Previous Team(s)
Hugh Doherty	N/A	N/A	F	Sr.	N/A	N/A
Sam Foley	N/A	N/A	G	Jr.	N/A	N/A
Harry "King" Kelly	N/A	N/A	G	So.	N/A	N/A
Bill Martin	5'8"	N/A	F	Grad. Stud.	Washington, DC, U.S.	Georgetown Preparatory School (North Bethesda, MD)
Johnny Shugrue	N/A	N/A	F	Jr.	Washington, DC, U.S.	Georgetown Preparatory School (North Bethesda, MD)
Jim Tormey	N/A	N/A	C	Jr.	Baltimore, MD, U.S.	Loyola College (Md.)
Dick Vlyman	N/A	N/A	G	Sr.	Washington, DC, U.S.	Central HS
Ronayne "Roy" Waldron	N/A	N/A	F	Sr.	Greensboro, PA, U.S.	N/A
Ed Walsh	N/A	N/A	F	Sr.	N/A	N/A

== 1913–14 schedule and results ==
It was common practice at this time for colleges and universities to include non-collegiate opponents in their schedules, with the games recognized as part of their official record for the season, and games played against the Washington YMCA and the Maryland Athletic Club counted as part of Georgetown's won-loss record for 1913–14. It was not until 1952, after the completion of the 1951–52 season, that the National Collegiate Athletic Association (NCAA) ruled that colleges and universities could no longer count games played against non-collegiate opponents in their annual won-loss records.

Date time, TV	Opponent	Result	Record	Site city, state
Regular Season
Wed., Dec. 10, 1913 no, no	Mount St. Joseph	W 25–8	1-0	Arcade Rink; Washington, DC
Mon., Dec. 15, 1913 no, no	New York University	L 25–31	1-1	Arcade Rink; Washington, DC
Thu., Dec. 18, 1913 no, no	at Seton Hall	W 24–20	2-1	N/A; South Orange, NJ
Fri., Dec. 19, 1913 no, no	at Fordham	L 19–35	2-2	N/A; New York, NY
Sat., Dec. 20, 1913 no, no	at St. John's (N.Y.)	L 24–26	2-3	N/A; New York, NY
Sun., Dec. 21, 1913 no, no	at New York University	L 18–38	2-4	N/A; New York, NY
Wed., Jan. 14, 1914 no, no	St. John's (Md.)	W 30–23	3-4	Arcade Rink; Washington, DC
Wed., Jan. 21, 1914 no, no	Loyola Maryland	cancelled		Arcade Rink; Washington, DC
Sat., Jan. 24, 1914 no, no	Washington YMCA	W 23–22	4-4	Arcade Rink; Washington, DC
Wed., Jan. 28, 1914 no, no	Maryland Athletic Club	W 28–12	5-4	Arcade Rink; Washington, DC
Sat., Jan. 31, 1914 no, no	at Washington YMCA	L 12–16	5-5	YMCA Hall; Washington, DC
Wed., Feb. 4, 1914 no, no	Gallaudet	W 26–17	6-5	Arcade Rink; Washington, DC
Fri., Feb. 6, 1914 no, no	Fordham	W 25–15	7-5	Arcade Rink; Washington, DC
Sat., Feb. 14, 1914 no, no	Washington YMCA	W 19–16	8-5	Arcade Rink; Washington, DC
N/A no, no	at Mount St. Joseph	W 32–20	9-5	Mount St. Joseph Gymnasium; Baltimore, MD
Tue., Feb. 17, 1914 no, no	Washington and Lee	W 19–10	10-5	Arcade Rink; Washington, DC
Sat., Feb. 21, 1914 no, no	at Navy	L 12–40	10-6	Dahlgren Hall; Annapolis, MD
Sat., Feb. 28, 1914 no, no	at Virginia	cancelled		N/A; Charlottesville, VA
*Non-conference game. (#) Tournament seedings in parentheses.
