= 1913–14 Navy Midshipmen men's basketball team =

American college basketball season

1913–14 Navy Midshipmen men's basketball

Southern champion
- Conference: Independent
- Record: 10–0
- Head coach: Laurence Wild (1st season)
- Home arena: Dahlgren Hall

1913–14 NCAA men's basketball independents standings
	Conf.				Overall
Team	W		L	PCT	W		L	PCT
California		–		–	2	–	0	1.000
Navy		–		–	10	–	0	1.000
Syracuse		–		–	12	–	0	1.000
Texas		–		–	11	–	0	1.000
Denison		–		–	15	–	1	.938
Virginia		–		–	12	–	1	.923
Grinnell		–		–	10	–	1	.909
Nebraska Wesleyan		–		–	19	–	2	.905
Georgia		–		–	9	–	1	.900
Saint Mary's (Calif.)		–		–	16	–	2	.889
Washington College		–		–	8	–	1	.889
Tennessee		–		–	15	–	2	.882
Oklahoma		–		–	7	–	1	.875
Rochester (N.Y.)		–		–	14	–	2	.875
Mississippi A&M		–		–	13	–	2	.867
Utah		–		–	13	–	2	.867
Kentucky		–		–	12	–	2	.857
Lehigh		–		–	12	–	2	.857
North Dakota Agricultural		–		–	12	–	2	.857
The Citadel		–		–	6	–	1	.857
Washington		–		–	12	–	2	.857
Richmond		–		–	5	–	1	.833
Seton Hall		–		–	14	–	3	.824
Brigham Young		–		–	8	–	2	.800
Central Missouri		–		–	15	–	4	.789
Union (N.Y.)		–		–	11	–	3	.786
Arizona		–		–	7	–	2	.778
Duquesne		–		–	7	–	2	.778
Kent State		–		–	7	–	2	.778
Catholic		–		–	13	–	4	.765
Millikin		–		–	12	–	4	.750
Virginia Tech		–		–	14	–	5	.737
Indiana State		–		–	11	–	4	.733
Kalamazoo		–		–	8	–	3	.727
Roanoke		–		–	13	–	5	.722
Fordham		–		–	20	–	8	.714
Swarthmore		–		–	10	–	4	.714
Texas A&M		–		–	5	–	2	.714
Utah State		–		–	10	–	4	.714
Nevada		–		–	7	–	3	.700
Oberlin		–		–	7	–	3	.700
Washington & Jefferson		–		–	7	–	3	.700
Niagara		–		–	9	–	4	.692
Idaho		–		–	11	–	5	.688
Notre Dame		–		–	11	–	5	.688
Wabash		–		–	11	–	5	.688
Carleton		–		–	10	–	5	.667
Detroit		–		–	6	–	3	.667
Michigan State		–		–	8	–	4	.667
Montana State		–		–	10	–	5	.667
Penn State		–		–	8	–	4	.667
St. Joseph's		–		–	10	–	5	.667
Tulane		–		–	8	–	4	.667
Vanderbilt		–		–	6	–	3	.667
Manhattan		–		–	11	–	6	.647
Augustana (Ill.)		–		–	9	–	5	.643
Canisius		–		–	5	–	3	.625
Georgetown		–		–	10	–	6	.625
Allegheny		–		–	8	–	5	.615
Lake Forest		–		–	8	–	5	.615
Grove City		–		–	11	–	7	.611
Alabama		–		–	6	–	4	.600
Rutgers		–		–	3	–	2	.600
Tulsa		–		–	3	–	2	.600
North Dakota		–		–	10	–	7	.588
Wake Forest		–		–	10	–	7	.588
Beloit		–		–	7	–	5	.583
Louisiana State		–		–	7	–	5	.583
Stanford		–		–	7	–	5	.583
Washington and Lee		–		–	7	–	5	.583
Trinity (N.C.)		–		–	12	–	9	.571
Washington State		–		–	13	–	10	.565
Dayton		–		–	5	–	4	.556
North Carolina		–		–	10	–	8	.556
Oregon Agricultural		–		–	10	–	8	.556
South Carolina		–		–	5	–	4	.556
Tempe Normal		–		–	6	–	5	.545
CCNY		–		–	6	–	5	.545
Mount Union		–		–	6	–	5	.545
Miami (Ohio)		–		–	7	–	6	.538
Southwestern (Kan.)		–		–	7	–	6	.538
Ole Miss		–		–	8	–	7	.533
Fairmount		–		–	8	–	7	.533
Akron		–		–	6	–	6	.500
Bradley		–		–	10	–	10	.500
Gettysburg		–		–	9	–	9	.500
Springfield (Mass.)		–		–	6	–	6	.500
Washburn		–		–	8	–	8	.500
Western State Normal		–		–	4	–	4	.500
Wisconsin–Stevens Point		–		–	7	–	7	.500
Pittsburgh		–		–	7	–	8	.467
North Carolina State		–		–	6	–	7	.462
Franklin		–		–	6	–	8	.429
Army		–		–	5	–	7	.417
Lafayette		–		–	5	–	7	.417
Loyola (Md.)		–		–	5	–	7	.417
Southern California		–		–	5	–	7	.417
Temple		–		–	5	–	7	.417
New York University		–		–	6	–	9	.400
St. Lawrence		–		–	6	–	9	.400
St. John's (N.Y.)		–		–	7	–	11	.389
VMI		–		–	4	–	7	.364
Oregon		–		–	6	–	11	.353
Bucknell		–		–	4	–	8	.333
Delaware		–		–	3	–	6	.333
Marietta		–		–	4	–	8	.333
Northern Colorado		–		–	1	–	2	.333
Santa Clara		–		–	2	–	4	.333
William & Mary		–		–	3	–	6	.333
Muhlenberg		–		–	4	–	10	.286
Clemson		–		–	1	–	3	.250
Louisville		–		–	2	–	6	.250
Wyoming		–		–	1	–	3	.250
Auburn		–		–	3	–	10	.231
Ohio		–		–	3	–	10	.231
George Washington		–		–	3	–	11	.214
Cincinnati		–		–	2	–	8	.200
Colgate		–		–	3	–	12	.200
Montana		–		–	2	–	9	.182
TCU		–		–	2	–	9	.182
Baylor		–		–	1	–	8	.111
Millsaps		–		–	0	–	8	.000
New Mexico		–		–	0	–	1	.000
Wooster		–		–	0	–	13	.000

The 1913–14 Navy Midshipmen men's basketball team represented the United States Naval Academy during the 1913–14 NCAA Division I college basketball season. Laurence Wild coached the team in his first season as head coach.

== Schedule ==
Date time, TV	Opponent	Result	Record	Site city, state
	New York U.	W 32–25	1–0	Dahlgren Hall; Annapolis, MD
Dec. 24, 1913* no, no	at Yale	W 34–23	2–0	Dahlgren Hall; Annapolis, MD
	Catholic	W 28–17	3–0	Dahlgren Hall; Annapolis, MD
	Loyola	W 66–22	4–0	Dahlgren Hall; Annapolis, MD
	Virginia Tech	W 51–15	5–0	Dahlgren Hall; Annapolis, MD
	Swarthmore	W 29–13	6–0	Dahlgren Hall; Annapolis, MD
Feb. 7, 1914 no, no	St. John's	W 59–13	7–0	Dahlgren Hall; Annapolis, MD
	George Washington	W 62–18	8–0	Dahlgren Hall; Annapolis, MD
Feb. 12, 1910 no, no	Washington & Lee	W 40–18	9–0	Dahlgren Hall; Annapolis, MD
Feb. 21, 1914 no, no	at Georgetown	W 40–12	10–0	Arcade Rink; Washington, DC
*Non-conference game. (#) Tournament seedings in parentheses.
