= 1913–14 Trinity Blue and White men's basketball team =

American college basketball season

1913–14 Trinity Blue and White men's basketball
- Conference: Independent
- Record: 11-9-1
- Head coach: Noble Clay (1st season)
- Captain: Beal Siler
- Home arena: The Ark

1913–14 NCAA men's basketball independents standings
| | Conf. | | | | Overall |
| Team | W | | L | PCT | W | | L | PCT |
|---|---|---|---|---|---|---|---|---|
| California | | – | | – | 2 | – | 0 | 1.000 |
| Navy | | – | | – | 10 | – | 0 | 1.000 |
| Syracuse | | – | | – | 12 | – | 0 | 1.000 |
| Texas | | – | | – | 11 | – | 0 | 1.000 |
| Denison | | – | | – | 15 | – | 1 | .938 |
| Virginia | | – | | – | 12 | – | 1 | .923 |
| Grinnell | | – | | – | 10 | – | 1 | .909 |
| Nebraska Wesleyan | | – | | – | 19 | – | 2 | .905 |
| Georgia | | – | | – | 9 | – | 1 | .900 |
| Saint Mary's (Calif.) | | – | | – | 16 | – | 2 | .889 |
| Washington College | | – | | – | 8 | – | 1 | .889 |
| Tennessee | | – | | – | 15 | – | 2 | .882 |
| Oklahoma | | – | | – | 7 | – | 1 | .875 |
| Rochester (N.Y.) | | – | | – | 14 | – | 2 | .875 |
| Mississippi A&M | | – | | – | 13 | – | 2 | .867 |
| Utah | | – | | – | 13 | – | 2 | .867 |
| Kentucky | | – | | – | 12 | – | 2 | .857 |
| Lehigh | | – | | – | 12 | – | 2 | .857 |
| North Dakota Agricultural | | – | | – | 12 | – | 2 | .857 |
| The Citadel | | – | | – | 6 | – | 1 | .857 |
| Washington | | – | | – | 12 | – | 2 | .857 |
| Richmond | | – | | – | 5 | – | 1 | .833 |
| Seton Hall | | – | | – | 14 | – | 3 | .824 |
| Brigham Young | | – | | – | 8 | – | 2 | .800 |
| Central Missouri | | – | | – | 15 | – | 4 | .789 |
| Union (N.Y.) | | – | | – | 11 | – | 3 | .786 |
| Arizona | | – | | – | 7 | – | 2 | .778 |
| Duquesne | | – | | – | 7 | – | 2 | .778 |
| Kent State | | – | | – | 7 | – | 2 | .778 |
| Catholic | | – | | – | 13 | – | 4 | .765 |
| Millikin | | – | | – | 12 | – | 4 | .750 |
| Virginia Tech | | – | | – | 14 | – | 5 | .737 |
| Indiana State | | – | | – | 11 | – | 4 | .733 |
| Kalamazoo | | – | | – | 8 | – | 3 | .727 |
| Roanoke | | – | | – | 13 | – | 5 | .722 |
| Fordham | | – | | – | 20 | – | 8 | .714 |
| Swarthmore | | – | | – | 10 | – | 4 | .714 |
| Texas A&M | | – | | – | 5 | – | 2 | .714 |
| Utah State | | – | | – | 10 | – | 4 | .714 |
| Nevada | | – | | – | 7 | – | 3 | .700 |
| Oberlin | | – | | – | 7 | – | 3 | .700 |
| Washington & Jefferson | | – | | – | 7 | – | 3 | .700 |
| Niagara | | – | | – | 9 | – | 4 | .692 |
| Idaho | | – | | – | 11 | – | 5 | .688 |
| Notre Dame | | – | | – | 11 | – | 5 | .688 |
| Wabash | | – | | – | 11 | – | 5 | .688 |
| Carleton | | – | | – | 10 | – | 5 | .667 |
| Detroit | | – | | – | 6 | – | 3 | .667 |
| Michigan State | | – | | – | 8 | – | 4 | .667 |
| Montana State | | – | | – | 10 | – | 5 | .667 |
| Penn State | | – | | – | 8 | – | 4 | .667 |
| St. Joseph's | | – | | – | 10 | – | 5 | .667 |
| Tulane | | – | | – | 8 | – | 4 | .667 |
| Vanderbilt | | – | | – | 6 | – | 3 | .667 |
| Manhattan | | – | | – | 11 | – | 6 | .647 |
| Augustana (Ill.) | | – | | – | 9 | – | 5 | .643 |
| Canisius | | – | | – | 5 | – | 3 | .625 |
| Georgetown | | – | | – | 10 | – | 6 | .625 |
| Allegheny | | – | | – | 8 | – | 5 | .615 |
| Lake Forest | | – | | – | 8 | – | 5 | .615 |
| Grove City | | – | | – | 11 | – | 7 | .611 |
| Alabama | | – | | – | 6 | – | 4 | .600 |
| Rutgers | | – | | – | 3 | – | 2 | .600 |
| Tulsa | | – | | – | 3 | – | 2 | .600 |
| North Dakota | | – | | – | 10 | – | 7 | .588 |
| Wake Forest | | – | | – | 10 | – | 7 | .588 |
| Beloit | | – | | – | 7 | – | 5 | .583 |
| Louisiana State | | – | | – | 7 | – | 5 | .583 |
| Stanford | | – | | – | 7 | – | 5 | .583 |
| Washington and Lee | | – | | – | 7 | – | 5 | .583 |
| Trinity (N.C.) | | – | | – | 12 | – | 9 | .571 |
| Washington State | | – | | – | 13 | – | 10 | .565 |
| Dayton | | – | | – | 5 | – | 4 | .556 |
| North Carolina | | – | | – | 10 | – | 8 | .556 |
| Oregon Agricultural | | – | | – | 10 | – | 8 | .556 |
| South Carolina | | – | | – | 5 | – | 4 | .556 |
| Tempe Normal | | – | | – | 6 | – | 5 | .545 |
| CCNY | | – | | – | 6 | – | 5 | .545 |
| Mount Union | | – | | – | 6 | – | 5 | .545 |
| Miami (Ohio) | | – | | – | 7 | – | 6 | .538 |
| Southwestern (Kan.) | | – | | – | 7 | – | 6 | .538 |
| Ole Miss | | – | | – | 8 | – | 7 | .533 |
| Fairmount | | – | | – | 8 | – | 7 | .533 |
| Akron | | – | | – | 6 | – | 6 | .500 |
| Bradley | | – | | – | 10 | – | 10 | .500 |
| Gettysburg | | – | | – | 9 | – | 9 | .500 |
| Springfield (Mass.) | | – | | – | 6 | – | 6 | .500 |
| Washburn | | – | | – | 8 | – | 8 | .500 |
| Western State Normal | | – | | – | 4 | – | 4 | .500 |
| Wisconsin–Stevens Point | | – | | – | 7 | – | 7 | .500 |
| Pittsburgh | | – | | – | 7 | – | 8 | .467 |
| North Carolina State | | – | | – | 6 | – | 7 | .462 |
| Franklin | | – | | – | 6 | – | 8 | .429 |
| Army | | – | | – | 5 | – | 7 | .417 |
| Lafayette | | – | | – | 5 | – | 7 | .417 |
| Loyola (Md.) | | – | | – | 5 | – | 7 | .417 |
| Southern California | | – | | – | 5 | – | 7 | .417 |
| Temple | | – | | – | 5 | – | 7 | .417 |
| New York University | | – | | – | 6 | – | 9 | .400 |
| St. Lawrence | | – | | – | 6 | – | 9 | .400 |
| St. John's (N.Y.) | | – | | – | 7 | – | 11 | .389 |
| VMI | | – | | – | 4 | – | 7 | .364 |
| Oregon | | – | | – | 6 | – | 11 | .353 |
| Bucknell | | – | | – | 4 | – | 8 | .333 |
| Delaware | | – | | – | 3 | – | 6 | .333 |
| Marietta | | – | | – | 4 | – | 8 | .333 |
| Northern Colorado | | – | | – | 1 | – | 2 | .333 |
| Santa Clara | | – | | – | 2 | – | 4 | .333 |
| William & Mary | | – | | – | 3 | – | 6 | .333 |
| Muhlenberg | | – | | – | 4 | – | 10 | .286 |
| Clemson | | – | | – | 1 | – | 3 | .250 |
| Louisville | | – | | – | 2 | – | 6 | .250 |
| Wyoming | | – | | – | 1 | – | 3 | .250 |
| Auburn | | – | | – | 3 | – | 10 | .231 |
| Ohio | | – | | – | 3 | – | 10 | .231 |
| George Washington | | – | | – | 3 | – | 11 | .214 |
| Cincinnati | | – | | – | 2 | – | 8 | .200 |
| Colgate | | – | | – | 3 | – | 12 | .200 |
| Montana | | – | | – | 2 | – | 9 | .182 |
| TCU | | – | | – | 2 | – | 9 | .182 |
| Baylor | | – | | – | 1 | – | 8 | .111 |
| Millsaps | | – | | – | 0 | – | 8 | .000 |
| New Mexico | | – | | – | 0 | – | 1 | .000 |
| Wooster | | – | | – | 0 | – | 13 | .000 |

The 1913–14 Trinity Blue and White's basketball team represented Trinity College (later renamed Duke University) during the 1913–14 men's college basketball season. The head coach was Noble Clay, coaching his first season with Trinity. The team finished with an overall record of 12–9.

== Schedule ==
| Date time, TV | Opponent | Result | Record | Site city, state |
|---|---|---|---|---|
| 12/15/1913* | at Elon | L 23–25 | 0–1 | |
| * | Elon | W 30–15 | 1–1 | The Ark; Durham, NC |
| * | at Asheville YMCA | W 20–19 | 2–1 | Asheville, NC |
| * | at Asheville YMCA | L 22–32 | 2–2 | Asheville, NC |
| * | at Wofford | W 52–15 | 3–2 | |
| * | at Charlotte YMCA | L 31–32 | 3–3 | Charlotte, NC |
| * | at Charlotte YMCA | L 26–28 | 3–4 | Charlotte, NC |
| * | Durham YMCA | L 24–27 | 3–5 | The Ark; Durham, NC |
| * | South Carolina | W 46–13 | 4–5 | The Ark; Durham, NC |
| * | Charlotte YMCA | W 61–13 | 5–5 | The Ark; Durham, NC |
| * | Roanoke | W 42–15 | 6–5 | The Ark; Durham, NC |
| * | at Durham YMCA | L 19–31 | 6–6 | Durham, NC |
| * | NC State | W 35–21 | 7–6 | The Ark; Durham, NC |
| * | Guilford | W 24–15 | 8–6 | The Ark; Durham, NC |
| * | Wake Forest | W 28–14 | 9–6 | The Ark; Durham, NC |
| * | NC State | T 25–25 | 9–6-1 | The Ark; Durham, NC |
| 2/10/1914* | Virginia | L 21–51 | 9–7-1 | Charlottesville, VA |
| 2/11/1914* | at Raleigh YMCA | W 23–19 | 10–7-1 | Raleigh, NC |
| 2/12/1914* | at Wake Forest | L 23–31 | 10–8-1 | Wake Forest, NC |
| 2/13/1914* | at Greensboro YMCA | W 30–22 | 11–8-1 | Greensboro, NC |
| 2/14/1914* | at Guilford | L 8–35 | 11–9-1 | |
*Non-conference game. (#) Tournament seedings in parentheses.
