= 1913–14 NC State Wolfpack men's basketball team =

American college basketball season

1913–14 NC State Wolfpack men's basketball
- Conference: Independent
- Record: 5–8
- Head coach: John Hegarty (1st season)
- Captain: Jeff Phillips

The 1913–14 NC State Wolfpack men's basketball team represented North Carolina State University during the 1913–14 NCAA men's basketball season. The Head coach was John Hegarty coaching the team in his first season.

== Schedule ==
Date time, TV	Opponent	Result	Record	Site city, state
*	South Carolina	W 30–15	1–0	Raleigh, NC
*	Elon	W 23–22	2–0	Raleigh, NC
*	Charlotte YMCA	W 42–21	3–0	Raleigh, NC
*	at Elon	L 19–35	3–1	Raleigh, NC
*	Roanoke	L 23–25	3–2	Salem, VA
*	Wake Forest	L 15–24	3–3	Raleigh, NC
*	Washington & Lee	L 15–48	3–4	Raleigh, NC
*	at Lynchburg YMCA	L 20–60	3–5	
*	VMI	W 29–20	4–5	Raleigh, NC
*	Duke	L 21–35	4–6	Raleigh, NC
*	Wake Forest	L 22–29	4–7	Raleigh, NC
*	Durham YMCA	W 33–27	5–7	Raleigh, NC
*	Guilford	L 25–33	5–8	Raleigh, NC
*Non-conference game. (#) Tournament seedings in parentheses.
