= 1916–17 Ohio Bobcats men's basketball team =

American college basketball season

1916–17 Ohio Bobcats men's basketball
- Conference: Ohio Athletic Conference
- Record: 2–14 (1–11 OAC)
- Head coach: M. B. Banks (4th season)
- Home arena: Ohio Gymnasium

1916–17 NCAA men's basketball independents standings
| | Conf. | | | | Overall |
| Team | W | | L | PCT | W | | L | PCT |
|---|---|---|---|---|---|---|---|---|
| Navy | | – | | – | 11 | – | 0 | 1.000 |
| Washington and Lee | | – | | – | 13 | – | 0 | 1.000 |
| Washington College | | – | | – | 2 | – | 0 | 1.000 |
| Montana State | | – | | – | 19 | – | 1 | .950 |
| Western Reserve | | – | | – | 12 | – | 1 | .923 |
| Kalamazoo | | – | | – | 12 | – | 1 | .923 |
| Louisiana State | | – | | – | 20 | – | 2 | .909 |
| Wabash | | – | | – | 19 | – | 2 | .905 |
| Canisius | | – | | – | 9 | – | 1 | .900 |
| Creighton | | – | | – | 18 | – | 2 | .900 |
| Virginia Tech | | – | | – | 17 | – | 2 | .895 |
| Georgia | | – | | – | 8 | – | 1 | .889 |
| North Dakota | | – | | – | 8 | – | 1 | .889 |
| Akron | | – | | – | 14 | – | 2 | .875 |
| Brigham Young | | – | | – | 14 | – | 2 | .875 |
| Roanoke | | – | | – | 7 | – | 1 | .875 |
| Central Missouri | | – | | – | 13 | – | 2 | .867 |
| Carleton | | – | | – | 12 | – | 2 | .857 |
| The Citadel | | – | | – | 6 | – | 1 | .857 |
| Penn State | | – | | – | 12 | – | 2 | .857 |
| SMU | | – | | – | 12 | – | 2 | .857 |
| Wisconsin–Stevens Point | | – | | – | 11 | – | 2 | .846 |
| Arizona | | – | | – | 10 | – | 2 | .833 |
| CCNY | | – | | – | 15 | – | 3 | .833 |
| Trinity (N.C.) | | – | | – | 20 | – | 4 | .833 |
| Denison | | – | | – | 13 | – | 3 | .813 |
| Seton Hall | | – | | – | 13 | – | 3 | .813 |
| Southwestern (Kan.) | | – | | – | 13 | – | 3 | .813 |
| Syracuse | | – | | – | 13 | – | 3 | .813 |
| Clemson | | – | | – | 8 | – | 2 | .800 |
| Miami (Ohio) | | – | | – | 12 | – | 3 | .800 |
| New Mexico | | – | | – | 4 | – | 1 | .800 |
| Santa Clara | | – | | – | 8 | – | 2 | .800 |
| Colgate | | – | | – | 15 | – | 4 | .789 |
| Lehigh | | – | | – | 15 | – | 4 | .789 |
| St. Joseph's | | – | | – | 18 | – | 5 | .783 |
| Indiana State | | – | | – | 13 | – | 4 | .765 |
| New York University | | – | | – | 9 | – | 3 | .750 |
| Oklahoma A&M | | – | | – | 11 | – | 4 | .733 |
| Augustana (Ill.) | | – | | – | 8 | – | 3 | .727 |
| Dayton | | – | | – | 8 | – | 3 | .727 |
| Fordham | | – | | – | 8 | – | 3 | .727 |
| Marquette | | – | | – | 8 | – | 3 | .727 |
| North Dakota Agricultural | | – | | – | 10 | – | 4 | .714 |
| Saint Mary's (Calif.) | | – | | – | 15 | – | 6 | .714 |
| Duquesne | | – | | – | 7 | – | 3 | .700 |
| Millikin | | – | | – | 14 | – | 6 | .700 |
| Nebraska Wesleyan | | – | | – | 14 | – | 6 | .700 |
| Grinnell | | – | | – | 9 | – | 4 | .692 |
| Bucknell | | – | | – | 11 | – | 5 | .688 |
| Gettysburg | | – | | – | 11 | – | 5 | .688 |
| Michigan State | | – | | – | 11 | – | 5 | .688 |
| Tulane | | – | | – | 11 | – | 5 | .688 |
| Marietta | | – | | – | 13 | – | 6 | .684 |
| Boston University | | – | | – | 6 | – | 3 | .667 |
| Georgetown | | – | | – | 8 | – | 4 | .667 |
| Nevada | | – | | – | 6 | – | 3 | .667 |
| New Mexico A&M | | – | | – | 10 | – | 5 | .667 |
| North Central | | – | | – | 10 | – | 5 | .667 |
| Pittsburgh | | – | | – | 12 | – | 6 | .667 |
| Rice | | – | | – | 10 | – | 5 | .667 |
| Springfield (Mass.) | | – | | – | 10 | – | 5 | .667 |
| Tennessee | | – | | – | 10 | – | 5 | .667 |
| Toledo | | – | | – | 2 | – | 1 | .667 |
| Davidson | | – | | – | 11 | – | 6 | .647 |
| VMI | | – | | – | 9 | – | 5 | .643 |
| Richmond | | – | | – | 7 | – | 4 | .636 |
| Bradley | | – | | – | 10 | – | 6 | .625 |
| Lafayette | | – | | – | 15 | – | 9 | .625 |
| Oklahoma | | – | | – | 13 | – | 8 | .619 |
| Notre Dame | | – | | – | 8 | – | 5 | .615 |
| Utah State | | – | | – | 8 | – | 5 | .615 |
| Ole Miss | | – | | – | 11 | – | 7 | .611 |
| Tulsa | | – | | – | 11 | – | 7 | .611 |
| Mississippi A&M | | – | | – | 6 | – | 4 | .600 |
| Wake Forest | | – | | – | 9 | – | 6 | .600 |
| Virginia | | – | | – | 7 | – | 5 | .583 |
| St. John's (N.Y.) | | – | | – | 11 | – | 8 | .579 |
| Delaware | | – | | – | 8 | – | 6 | .571 |
| Union (N.Y.) | | – | | – | 9 | – | 7 | .563 |
| Detroit | | – | | – | 5 | – | 4 | .556 |
| North Carolina | | – | | – | 5 | – | 4 | .556 |
| North Carolina State | | – | | – | 10 | – | 8 | .556 |
| Catholic | | – | | – | 6 | – | 5 | .545 |
| Butler | | – | | – | 7 | – | 6 | .538 |
| Western State Normal | | – | | – | 7 | – | 6 | .538 |
| Temple | | – | | – | 10 | – | 9 | .526 |
| Auburn | | – | | – | 2 | – | 2 | .500 |
| DePauw | | – | | – | 7 | – | 7 | .500 |
| Idaho | | – | | – | 8 | – | 8 | .500 |
| Loyola (Md.) | | – | | – | 6 | – | 6 | .500 |
| Millsaps | | – | | – | 5 | – | 5 | .500 |
| Stevens Institute | | – | | – | 3 | – | 3 | .500 |
| Utah | | – | | – | 3 | – | 3 | .500 |
| Washington & Jefferson | | – | | – | 5 | – | 5 | .500 |
| West Virginia | | – | | – | 8 | – | 8 | .500 |
| Wyoming | | – | | – | 4 | – | 4 | .500 |
| George Washington | | – | | – | 7 | – | 8 | .467 |
| Manhattan | | – | | – | 7 | – | 8 | .467 |
| South Carolina | | – | | – | 7 | – | 8 | .467 |
| Grove City | | – | | – | 5 | – | 6 | .455 |
| Saint Louis | | – | | – | 5 | – | 6 | .455 |
| Rutgers | | – | | – | 4 | – | 5 | .444 |
| Alabama | | – | | – | 6 | – | 8 | .429 |
| Buffalo | | – | | – | 6 | – | 8 | .429 |
| Mount Union | | – | | – | 6 | – | 8 | .429 |
| Northern Colorado | | – | | – | 5 | – | 7 | .417 |
| Connecticut | | – | | – | 4 | – | 6 | .400 |
| Kentucky | | – | | – | 4 | – | 6 | .400 |
| Southern California | | – | | – | 8 | – | 12 | .400 |
| Wooster | | – | | – | 5 | – | 8 | .385 |
| Swarthmore | | – | | – | 4 | – | 7 | .364 |
| Franklin | | – | | – | 1 | – | 2 | .333 |
| Muhlenberg | | – | | – | 2 | – | 4 | .333 |
| Washburn | | – | | – | 5 | – | 11 | .313 |
| William & Mary | | – | | – | 4 | – | 9 | .308 |
| Niagara | | – | | – | 2 | – | 5 | .286 |
| Army | | – | | – | 3 | – | 8 | .273 |
| Cincinnati | | – | | – | 3 | – | 8 | .273 |
| Vanderbilt | | – | | – | 3 | – | 8 | .273 |
| Montana | | – | | – | 4 | – | 11 | .267 |
| Bowling Green State | | – | | – | 2 | – | 6 | .250 |
| Kent State | | – | | – | 2 | – | 6 | .250 |
| Rhode Island State | | – | | – | 2 | – | 6 | .250 |
| Rochester (N.Y.) | | – | | – | 4 | – | 12 | .250 |
| Texas Christian | | – | | – | 2 | – | 6 | .250 |
| Fairmount | | – | | – | 2 | – | 11 | .154 |
| Ohio | | – | | – | 2 | – | 14 | .125 |
| Tempe Normal | | – | | – | 0 | – | 1 | .000 |

The 1916–17 Ohio Bobcats men's basketball team represented Ohio University. M. B. Banks was the head coach for Ohio. The Bobcats played their home games in Ohio Gymnasium.

== Schedule ==
| Date time, TV | Rank^{#} | Opponent^{#} | Result | Record | Site (attendance) city, state |
Regular Season
| * | | Wheeling YMCA | L 22–38 | 0–1 | Ohio Gymnasium; Athens, OH |
| * | | Wellsburg School | L 20–29 | 0–2 | Ohio Gymnasium; Athens, OH |
| * | | Antioch | W 20–19 | 1–2 | Ohio Gymnasium; Athens, OH |
| | | at Kenyon | L 16–48 | 1–3 | Gambier, OH |
| | | Akron | L 22–28 | 1–4 | Ohio Gymnasium; Athens, OH |
| | | at Wooster | L 24–28 | 1–5 | Wooster, OH |
| | | Akron | L 13–48 | 1–6 | Ohio Gymnasium; Athens, OH |
| | | at Baldwin Wallace | W 40–13 | 2–6 | Berea, OH |
| | | at Oberlin | L 17–33 | 2–7 | Oberlin, OH |
| | | Mountain Union | L 21–32 | 2–8 | Ohio Gymnasium; Athens, OH |
| | | at Wittenberg | L 25–34 | 2–9 | Springfield, OH |
| | | Ohio Wesleyan | L 16–41 | 2–10 | Ohio Gymnasium; Athens, OH |
| | | Cincinnati | L 23–28 | 2–11 | Ohio Gymnasium; Athens, OH |
| * | | West Virginia | L 21–30 | 2–12 | Ohio Gymnasium; Athens, OH |
| | | Western Reserve | L 24–26 | 2–13 | Ohio Gymnasium; Athens, OH |
| | | Kenyon | L 15–48 | 2–14 | Ohio Gymnasium; Athens, OH |
*Non-conference game. ^{#}Rankings from AP Poll. (#) Tournament seedings in parentheses. All times are in Eastern Time.
