= 1916–17 Indiana State Sycamores men's basketball team =

American college basketball season

1916–17 Indiana State Sycamores men's basketball
- Conference: Independent
- Record: 13–4
- Head coach: Alfred Westphal (5th season)
- Home arena: North Hall

1916–17 NCAA men's basketball independents standings
	Conf.				Overall
Team	W		L	PCT	W		L	PCT
Navy		–		–	11	–	0	1.000
Washington and Lee		–		–	13	–	0	1.000
Washington College		–		–	2	–	0	1.000
Montana State		–		–	19	–	1	.950
Western Reserve		–		–	12	–	1	.923
Kalamazoo		–		–	12	–	1	.923
Louisiana State		–		–	20	–	2	.909
Wabash		–		–	19	–	2	.905
Canisius		–		–	9	–	1	.900
Creighton		–		–	18	–	2	.900
Virginia Tech		–		–	17	–	2	.895
Georgia		–		–	8	–	1	.889
North Dakota		–		–	8	–	1	.889
Akron		–		–	14	–	2	.875
Brigham Young		–		–	14	–	2	.875
Roanoke		–		–	7	–	1	.875
Central Missouri		–		–	13	–	2	.867
Carleton		–		–	12	–	2	.857
The Citadel		–		–	6	–	1	.857
Penn State		–		–	12	–	2	.857
SMU		–		–	12	–	2	.857
Wisconsin–Stevens Point		–		–	11	–	2	.846
Arizona		–		–	10	–	2	.833
CCNY		–		–	15	–	3	.833
Trinity (N.C.)		–		–	20	–	4	.833
Denison		–		–	13	–	3	.813
Seton Hall		–		–	13	–	3	.813
Southwestern (Kan.)		–		–	13	–	3	.813
Syracuse		–		–	13	–	3	.813
Clemson		–		–	8	–	2	.800
Miami (Ohio)		–		–	12	–	3	.800
New Mexico		–		–	4	–	1	.800
Santa Clara		–		–	8	–	2	.800
Colgate		–		–	15	–	4	.789
Lehigh		–		–	15	–	4	.789
St. Joseph's		–		–	18	–	5	.783
Indiana State		–		–	13	–	4	.765
New York University		–		–	9	–	3	.750
Oklahoma A&M		–		–	11	–	4	.733
Augustana (Ill.)		–		–	8	–	3	.727
Dayton		–		–	8	–	3	.727
Fordham		–		–	8	–	3	.727
Marquette		–		–	8	–	3	.727
North Dakota Agricultural		–		–	10	–	4	.714
Saint Mary's (Calif.)		–		–	15	–	6	.714
Duquesne		–		–	7	–	3	.700
Millikin		–		–	14	–	6	.700
Nebraska Wesleyan		–		–	14	–	6	.700
Grinnell		–		–	9	–	4	.692
Bucknell		–		–	11	–	5	.688
Gettysburg		–		–	11	–	5	.688
Michigan State		–		–	11	–	5	.688
Tulane		–		–	11	–	5	.688
Marietta		–		–	13	–	6	.684
Boston University		–		–	6	–	3	.667
Georgetown		–		–	8	–	4	.667
Nevada		–		–	6	–	3	.667
New Mexico A&M		–		–	10	–	5	.667
North Central		–		–	10	–	5	.667
Pittsburgh		–		–	12	–	6	.667
Rice		–		–	10	–	5	.667
Springfield (Mass.)		–		–	10	–	5	.667
Tennessee		–		–	10	–	5	.667
Toledo		–		–	2	–	1	.667
Davidson		–		–	11	–	6	.647
VMI		–		–	9	–	5	.643
Richmond		–		–	7	–	4	.636
Bradley		–		–	10	–	6	.625
Lafayette		–		–	15	–	9	.625
Oklahoma		–		–	13	–	8	.619
Notre Dame		–		–	8	–	5	.615
Utah State		–		–	8	–	5	.615
Ole Miss		–		–	11	–	7	.611
Tulsa		–		–	11	–	7	.611
Mississippi A&M		–		–	6	–	4	.600
Wake Forest		–		–	9	–	6	.600
Virginia		–		–	7	–	5	.583
St. John's (N.Y.)		–		–	11	–	8	.579
Delaware		–		–	8	–	6	.571
Union (N.Y.)		–		–	9	–	7	.563
Detroit		–		–	5	–	4	.556
North Carolina		–		–	5	–	4	.556
North Carolina State		–		–	10	–	8	.556
Catholic		–		–	6	–	5	.545
Butler		–		–	7	–	6	.538
Western State Normal		–		–	7	–	6	.538
Temple		–		–	10	–	9	.526
Auburn		–		–	2	–	2	.500
DePauw		–		–	7	–	7	.500
Idaho		–		–	8	–	8	.500
Loyola (Md.)		–		–	6	–	6	.500
Millsaps		–		–	5	–	5	.500
Stevens Institute		–		–	3	–	3	.500
Utah		–		–	3	–	3	.500
Washington & Jefferson		–		–	5	–	5	.500
West Virginia		–		–	8	–	8	.500
Wyoming		–		–	4	–	4	.500
George Washington		–		–	7	–	8	.467
Manhattan		–		–	7	–	8	.467
South Carolina		–		–	7	–	8	.467
Grove City		–		–	5	–	6	.455
Saint Louis		–		–	5	–	6	.455
Rutgers		–		–	4	–	5	.444
Alabama		–		–	6	–	8	.429
Buffalo		–		–	6	–	8	.429
Mount Union		–		–	6	–	8	.429
Northern Colorado		–		–	5	–	7	.417
Connecticut		–		–	4	–	6	.400
Kentucky		–		–	4	–	6	.400
Southern California		–		–	8	–	12	.400
Wooster		–		–	5	–	8	.385
Swarthmore		–		–	4	–	7	.364
Franklin		–		–	1	–	2	.333
Muhlenberg		–		–	2	–	4	.333
Washburn		–		–	5	–	11	.313
William & Mary		–		–	4	–	9	.308
Niagara		–		–	2	–	5	.286
Army		–		–	3	–	8	.273
Cincinnati		–		–	3	–	8	.273
Vanderbilt		–		–	3	–	8	.273
Montana		–		–	4	–	11	.267
Bowling Green State		–		–	2	–	6	.250
Kent State		–		–	2	–	6	.250
Rhode Island State		–		–	2	–	6	.250
Rochester (N.Y.)		–		–	4	–	12	.250
Texas Christian		–		–	2	–	6	.250
Fairmount		–		–	2	–	11	.154
Ohio		–		–	2	–	14	.125
Tempe Normal		–		–	0	–	1	.000

The 1916–17 Indiana State Sycamores men's basketball team represented Indiana State University during the 1916–17 college men's basketball season. The head coach was Alfred Westphal, coaching the sycamores in his fifth season. The team played their home games at North Hall in Terre Haute, Indiana.

== Schedule ==
Date time, TV	Opponent	Result	Record	Site city, state
12/06/1916	Merom Christian	W 28–25	1–0	North Hall; Terre Haute, IN
12/09/1916	at ISNS Alumni	W 58–08	2–0	North Hall; Terre Haute, IN
12/15/1916	Southern Illinois	W 41–22	3–0	North Hall; Terre Haute, IN
12/20/1916	Central Normal	W 30–22	4–0	North Hall; Terre Haute, IN
1/05/1917	at Moores Hill	W 84–23	5–0	Moores Hill, IN
1/12/1917	at Earlham	L 19–35	5–1	Richmond, IN
1/13/1917	at Central Normal	W 30–10	6–1	
1/14/1916	at Rose Polytechnic	W 27–26	7–1	
1/18/1917	at DePauw	L 17–22	7–2	Greencastle, IN
2/02/1917	Franklin	L 34–40	7–3	North Hall; Terre Haute, IN
2/08/1917	Georgetown	W 66–27	8–3	North Hall; Terre Haute, IN
2/10/1917	Butler	W 29–12	9–3	North Hall; Terre Haute, IN
2/13/1917	at Merom Christian	W 37–21	10–3	
2/17/1917	at Butler	W 35–31	11–3	Indianapolis, IN
2/23/1917	Earlham	L 31–36	11–4	North Hall; Terre Haute, IN
2/27/1917	Rose Polytechnic	W 35–12	12–4	North Hall; Terre Haute, IN
3/02/1917	DePauw	W 44–25	13–4	North Hall; Terre Haute, IN
*Non-conference game. (#) Tournament seedings in parentheses.
