= 1916–17 Idaho men's basketball team =

American college basketball season

1916–17 Idaho men's basketball
- Record: 8–8 ( )
- Head coach: Hec Edmundson (1st season)
- Captain: Charlie Gray
- Home arena: Armory and Gymnasium

The 1916–17 Idaho men's basketball team represented the University of Idaho during the 1916–17 college basketball season. Idaho was led by first-year head coach Hec Edmundson and played their home games on campus at the Armory and Gymnasium in Moscow, Idaho.

Idaho was 8–8 overall.

Alumnus Edmundson, a Moscow native (and an Olympian in track in 1912) led the basketball program for two seasons, then coached at Washington in Seattle for decades, starting in 1920.
