= List of Clemson Tigers men's basketball seasons =

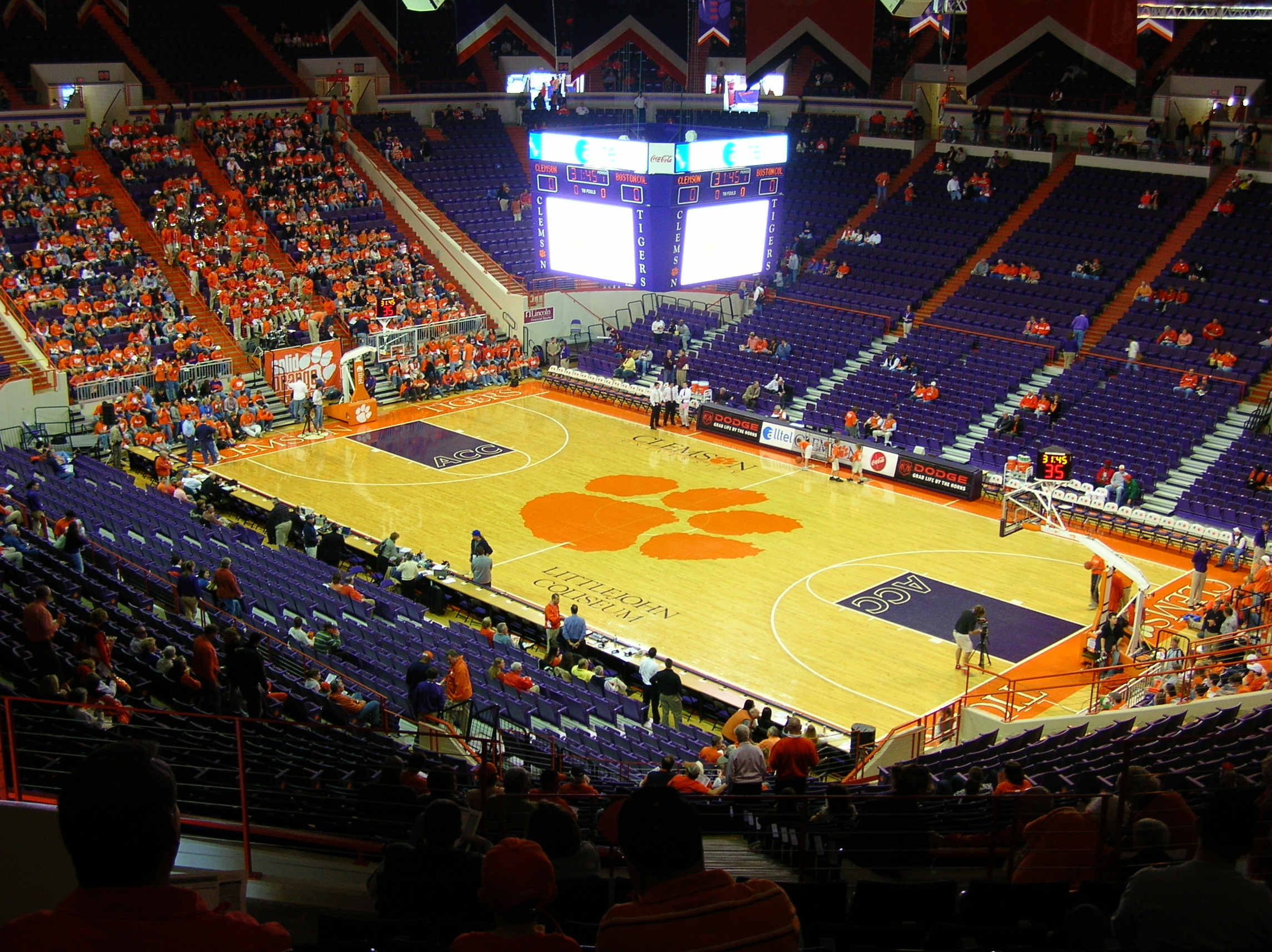
Clemson plays their home games in Littlejohn Coliseum.

The Clemson Tigers college basketball team competes in the National Collegiate Athletic Association's (NCAA) Division I, representing Clemson University in the Atlantic Coast Conference. Clemson has played its home games at Littlejohn Coliseum in Clemson, South Carolina since its opening in 1968.

Clemson fielded its first intercollegiate men's basketball team during the 1911–12 season. The school's athletics teams are known as the "Tigers". In 1921, Clemson and thirteen other members left the Southern Intercollegiate Athletic Association to form the Southern Conference. After relatively poor showing early, the Tigers won the 1939 conference tournament, their only men's basketball conference championship.

Clemson and six other schools left the Southern Conference in 1953 and formed the Atlantic Coast Conference. On two occasions, the Tigers reached the final of the ACC tournament. Clemson received their first postseason bid in 1975 to the National Invitation Tournament (NIT). In 1980, the Tigers reached the Elite Eight of the NCAA tournament, which was their best showing until 2024 when they reached the Elite Eight again. Clemson has 15 NCAA Tournament appearances to date. Clemson has also reached the final of the NIT twice, in 1999 and 2007.

== Seasons ==
Statistics overview
Season	Coach	Overall	Conference	Standing	Postseason
Frank Dobson (Southern Intercollegiate Athletic Association) (1911–1913)
1911–12	Frank Dobson	4–0			
1912–13	Frank Dobson	9–5			
John W. Erwin (Southern Intercollegiate Athletic Association) (1913–1915)
1913–14	John W. Erwin	1–3			
1914–15	John W. Erwin	3–5			
Audley H. Ward (Southern Intercollegiate Athletic Association) (1915–1916)
1915–16	Audley H. Ward	2–6–1			
Country Morris (Southern Intercollegiate Athletic Association) (1916–1917)
1916–17	Country Morris	8–2			
Edward Donahue (Southern Intercollegiate Athletic Association) (1917–1919)
1917–18	Edward Donahue	3–2			
1918–19	Edward Donahue	3–1			
Country Morris (Southern Intercollegiate Athletic Association) (1919–1920)
1919–20	Country Morris	8–6			
Larry Conover (Southern Intercollegiate Athletic Association) (1920–1921)
1920–21	Larry Conover	10–5			
E. J. Stewart (Southern Conference) (1921–1923)
1921–22	E. J. Stewart	8–13	0–3	12th	
1922–23	E. J. Stewart	11–6	3–3	T-8th	
Bud Saunders (Southern Conference) (1923–1925)
1923–24	Bud Saunders	2–17	0–8	T–19th	
1924–25	Bud Saunders	4–14	3–2	T–8th	
Tink Gillam (Southern Conference) (1925–1927)
1925–26	Tink Gillam	4–17	1–7	T–19th	
1926–27	Tink Gillam	2–13	1–7	19th	
Josh Cody (Southern Conference) (1927–1931)
1927–28	Josh Cody	9–14	5–7	11th	
1928–29	Josh Cody	14–13	6–4	9th	
1929–30	Josh Cody	16–9	8–4	8th	
1930–31	Josh Cody	6–7	3–5	15th	
Joe Davis (Southern Conference) (1931–1940)
1931–32	Joe Davis	7–13	2–9	21st	
1932–33	Joe Davis	10–9	0–2	10th	
1933–34	Joe Davis	7–12	0–6	10th	
1934–35	Joe Davis	15–3	3–1	2nd	
1935–36	Joe Davis	15–7	5–5	5th	
1936–37	Joe Davis	6–15	3–7	14th	
1937–38	Joe Davis	16–7	9–4	4th	
1938–39	Joe Davis	16–8	6–6	T–9th	
1939–40	Joe Davis	9–12	9–7	6th	
Rock Norman (Southern Conference) (1940–1946)
1940–41	Rock Norman	8–14	7–8	7th	
1941–42	Rock Norman	3–14	2–10	15th	
1942–43	Rock Norman	3–13	0–10	15th	
1943–44	Rock Norman	1–10	0–3	T–7th	
1944–45	Rock Norman	8–8	4–5	8th	
1945–46	Rock Norman	9–11	5–7	T–9th	
Banks McFadden (Southern Conference) (1946–1953)
1946–47	Banks McFadden	7–13	2–12	14th	
1947–48	Banks McFadden	6–17	3–14	15th	
1948–49	Banks McFadden	10–11	6–9	11th	
1949–50	Banks McFadden	10–10	8–8	9th	
1950–51	Banks McFadden	11–7	9–4	3rd	
1951–52	Banks McFadden	17–7	11–4	4th	
1952–53	Banks McFadden	8–10	6–8	10th	
Banks McFadden (Atlantic Coast Conference) (1953–1956)
1953–54	Banks McFadden	5–18	0–9	8th	
1954–55	Banks McFadden	2–21	0–14	8th	
1955–56	Banks McFadden	9–17	1–13	8th	
Press Maravich (Atlantic Coast Conference) (1956–1962)
1956–57	Press Maravich	7–17	3–11	T–7th	
1957–58	Press Maravich	8–16	4–10	6th	
1958–59	Press Maravich	8–16	5–9	T–6th	
1959–60	Press Maravich	10–16	4–10	7th	
1960–61	Press Maravich	10–16	5–9	6th	
1961–62	Press Maravich	12–15	4–10	6th	
Bobby Roberts (Atlantic Coast Conference) (1962–1970)
1962–63	Bobby Roberts	12–13	5–9	T–4th	
1963–64	Bobby Roberts	13–12	8–6	3rd	
1964–65	Bobby Roberts	8–15	4–10	6th	
1965–66	Bobby Roberts	15–10	8–6	T–3rd	
1966–67	Bobby Roberts	17–8	9–5	4th	
1967–68	Bobby Roberts	4–20	3–11	T–7th	
1968–69	Bobby Roberts	6–19	2–12	T–7th	
1969–70	Bobby Roberts	7–19	2–12	8th	
Tates Locke (Atlantic Coast Conference) (1970–1975)
1970–71	Tates Locke	9–17	3–11	8th	
1971–72	Tates Locke	10–16	2–10	7th	
1972–73	Tates Locke	12–14	4–8	T–4th	
1973–74	Tates Locke	14–12	3–9	T–5th	
1974–75	Tates Locke	17–11	8–4	T–2nd	NIT First Round
Bill Foster (Atlantic Coast Conference) (1975–1984)
1975–76	Bill Foster	18–10	5–7	4th	
1976–77	Bill Foster	22–6	8–4	T–2nd	
1977–78	Bill Foster	15–12	3–9	T–6th	
1978–79	Bill Foster	19–10	5–7	5th	NIT Second Round
1979–80	Bill Foster	23–9	8–6	4th	NCAA Division I Elite Eight
1980–81	Bill Foster	20–11	6–8	T–5th	NIT First Round
1981–82	Bill Foster	14–14	4–10	T–6th	NIT First Round
1982–83	Bill Foster	11–20	2–12	8th	
1983–84	Bill Foster	14–14	3–11	8th	
Cliff Ellis (Atlantic Coast Conference) (1984–1994)
1984–85	Cliff Ellis	16–13	5–9	T–6th	NIT First Round
1985–86	Cliff Ellis	19–15	3–11	7th	NIT Quarterfinals
1986–87	Cliff Ellis	25–6	10–4	2nd	NCAA Division I First Round
1987–88	Cliff Ellis	14–15	4–10	7th	NIT First Round
1988–89	Cliff Ellis	19–11	7–7	6th	NCAA Division I Second Round
1989–90	Cliff Ellis	26–9^{[Note A]}	10–4	1st	NCAA Division I Sweet Sixteen
1990–91	Cliff Ellis	11–17	2–12	7th	
1991–92	Cliff Ellis	14–14	4–12	9th	
1992–93	Cliff Ellis	17–13	5–11	7th	NIT Second Round
1993–94	Cliff Ellis	18–16	6–10	T–7th	NIT Quarterfinals
Rick Barnes (Atlantic Coast Conference) (1994–1998)
1994–95	Rick Barnes	15–13	5–11	T–6th	NIT First Round
1995–96	Rick Barnes	18–11	7–9	6th	NCAA Division I First Round
1996–97	Rick Barnes	23–10	9–7	4th	NCAA Division I Sweet Sixteen
1997–98	Rick Barnes	18–14	7–9	T–4th	NCAA Division I First Round
Larry Shyatt (Atlantic Coast Conference) (1998–2003)
1998–99	Larry Shyatt	20–15	5–11	7th	NIT Runner-Up
1999–00	Larry Shyatt	10–20	4–12	9th	
2000–01	Larry Shyatt	12–19	2–14	9th	
2001–02	Larry Shyatt	13–17	4–12	9th	
2002–03	Larry Shyatt	15–13	5–11	8th	
Oliver Purnell (Atlantic Coast Conference) (2003–2010)
2003–04	Oliver Purnell	10–18	3–13	9th	
2004–05	Oliver Purnell	16–16	5–11	9th	NIT First Round
2005–06	Oliver Purnell	19–15	7–9	9th	NIT Second Round
2006–07	Oliver Purnell	25–11	7–9	T–8th	NIT Runner-Up
2007–08	Oliver Purnell	24–10	10–6	3rd	NCAA Division I First Round
2008–09	Oliver Purnell	23–9	9–7	T–5th	NCAA Division I First Round
2009–10	Oliver Purnell	21–11	9–7	T–5th	NCAA Division I First Round
Brad Brownell (Atlantic Coast Conference) (2010–present)
2010–11	Brad Brownell	22–12	9–7	T–4th	NCAA Division I First Round
2011–12	Brad Brownell	16–15	8–8	7th	
2012–13	Brad Brownell	13–18	5–13	11th	
2013–14	Brad Brownell	23–13	10–8	6th	NIT Semifinals
2014–15	Brad Brownell	16–15	8–10	T–9th	
2015–16	Brad Brownell	17–14	10–8	T–7th	
2016–17	Brad Brownell	17–16	6–12	12th	NIT First Round
2017–18	Brad Brownell	25–10	11–7	T–3rd	NCAA Division I Sweet Sixteen
2018–19	Brad Brownell	20–14	9–9	T–8th	NIT Second Round
2019–20	Brad Brownell	16–15	9–11	9th	No postseason held
2020–21	Brad Brownell	16–8	10–6	T–5th	NCAA Division I First Round
2021–22	Brad Brownell	17–16	8–12	10th	
2022–23	Brad Brownell	23–11	14–6	T–3rd	NIT First Round
2023–24	Brad Brownell	24–12	11–9	T–5th	NCAA Division I Elite Eight
2024–25	Brad Brownell	27–7	18–2	T–2nd	NCAA Division I First Round
2025–26	Brad Brownell	24–11	12–6	T–4th	NCAA Division I First Round
Total:		1,478–1,383–2 (.517)			
National champion Postseason invitational champion Conference regular season champion Conference regular season and conference tournament champion Division regular season champion Division regular season and conference tournament champion Conference tournament champion

^A. Clemson's 1990 NCAA Sweet Sixteen appearance was vacated by the NCAA Committee on Infractions.
