= 1912–13 South Carolina Gamecocks men's basketball team =

American college basketball season

1912–13 South Carolina Gamecocks men's basketball
- Conference: Independent
- Record: 2–3
- Head coach: James G. Driver (2nd season)

The 1912–13 South Carolina Gamecocks men's basketball team represented University of South Carolina during the 1912–13 NCAA men's basketball season. The head coach was James G. Driver coaching the Gamecocks in his second season.

== Schedule ==
Date time, TV	Opponent	Result	Record	Site city, state
January 10*	at Washington and Lee	L 7–47	0–1	Lexington, VA
January 11*	at VMI	L 13–26	0–2	Lexington, VA
January 31*	Newberry	W 44–10	1–2	Columbia, SC
February 6*	Clemson	W 39–18	2–2	Columbia, SC
February 22*	Wake Forest	L 20–27	2–3	Columbia, SC
*Non-conference game. (#) Tournament seedings in parentheses.
