= John Erwin (basketball) =

John W. Erwin
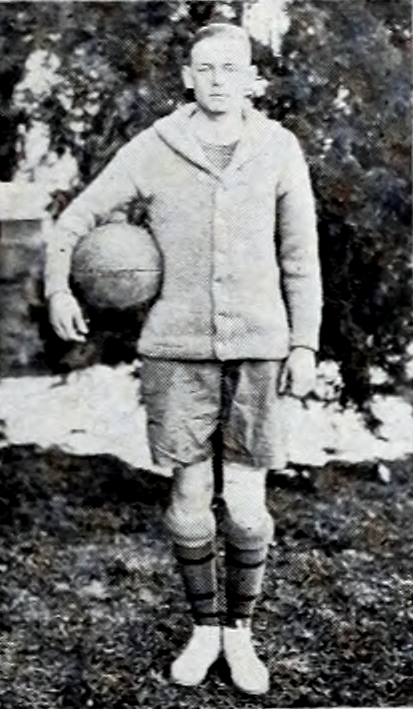
- Erwin in 1914

Biographical details
- Born: April 5, 1894; Spartanburg, South Carolina, U.S.
- Died: March 3, 1972 (aged 77); Spartanburg, South Carolina, U.S.

Playing career

Basketball, tennis
- 1911–1914: Clemson

Coaching career (HC unless noted)

Basketball
- 1913–1915: Clemson

Head coaching record
- Overall: 4–8 (.333)

John Watson Erwin (April 5, 1894 – March 3, 1972) was an American college basketball coach. Born in Spartanburg, South Carolina, in 1894, he attended Clemson College from 1911 to 1914, where he excelled in both tennis and basketball. Alongside his brother James, he won the Southern Intercollegiate Athletic Association doubles championship in 1913. Erwin played on Clemson's first basketball team in 1912, and was captain and player-coach in the 1914 season. He also coached the 1915 team. After leaving Clemson, he ran a grocery wholesaler in Spartanburg, and died in 1972.

== Head coaching record ==
Record table
Season	Team	Overall	Conference	Standing	Postseason
Clemson Tigers (Southern Intercollegiate Athletic Association) (1913–1915)
1913–14	Clemson	1–3			
1914–15	Clemson	3–5			
Clemson:		4–8 (.333)			
Total:		4–8 (.333)			
National champion Postseason invitational champion Conference regular season champion Conference regular season and conference tournament champion Division regular season champion Division regular season and conference tournament champion Conference tournament champion
