= Audley H. Ward =

American agronomist and college basketball coach

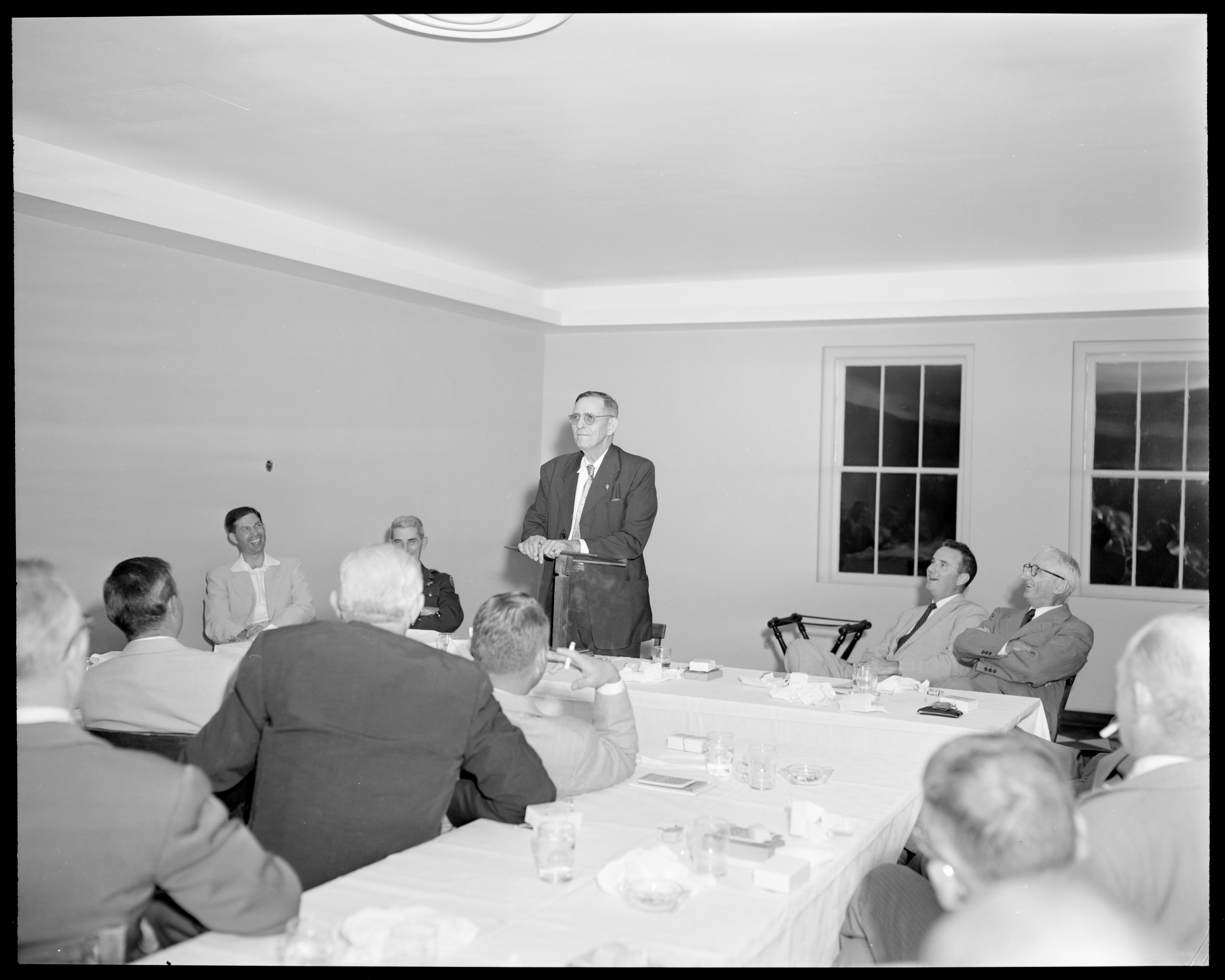
- Ward in 1954

Biographical details
- Born: June 5, 1891; Florence County, South Carolina, U.S.
- Died: August 17, 1974 (aged 83); Augusta, Georgia, U.S.
- Education: Clemson (BS 1914); Wisconsin (MS 1915)

Coaching career (HC unless noted)

Basketball
- 1915–1916: Clemson

Head coaching record
- Overall: 2–6–1 (.278)

Audley Hoffman Ward (June 5, 1891 – August 17, 1974) was an American agronomist and college basketball coach. Ward attended Clemson College, where he was on the track team and graduated in 1914 with a degree in agronomy. After completing a master's degree at the University of Wisconsin–Madison, he joined the Clemson faculty in 1915 as an assistant in agronomy and farm machinery. In 1916, Ward served as volunteer basketball and track coach.

Ward served in the United States Army during World War I, and then began a long career with the Clemson extension service, first as a county agent for Darlington County, and then as a district agent based in Aiken, before retiring in 1957. He held a number of civic posts, including national vice-commander of the American Legion.
