= 1914–15 West Virginia Mountaineers men's basketball team =

American college basketball season

1914–15 West Virginia Mountaineers men's basketball
- Conference: Independent
- Record: 10–10
- Head coach: George Pyle (1st season)
- Captain: Stuart Race

The 1914–15 West Virginia Mountaineers men's basketball team represented the University of West Virginia during the 1914–15 college men's basketball season. The head coach was George Pyle, coaching his first season with the Mountaineers.

== Schedule ==
Date time, TV	Opponent	Result	Record	Site city, state
December 19, 1914*	at Davis & Elkins	L 25–37	0–1	Elkins, WV
January 8, 1915*	at Fairmont YMCA	W 47–18	1–1	Fairmont, WV
January 16, 1915*	Fairmont YMCA	W 33–20	2–1	Morgantown, WV
January 23, 1915*	Davis & Elkins	W 59–18	3–1	Morgantown, WV
January 29, 1915*	at Pitt	L 18–42	3–2	Trees Gym; Pittsburgh, PA
January 30, 1915*	at Duquesne	L 21–28	3–3	Duquesne Garden; Pittsburgh, PA
February 6, 1915*	at West Virginia Wesleyan	L 20–32	3–4	Buckhannon, WV
February 8, 1915*	West Virginia Wesleyan	L 18–24	3–5	Morgantown, WV
February 13, 1915*	Bethany	L 19–24	4–5	Morgantown, WV
February 20, 1915*	Clarksburg Scholastics	W 36–01	5–5	Morgantown, WV
February 22, 1915*	at Marietta	L 17–24	5–6	Marietta, OH
February 23, 1915*	at Chas. National Guard	W 26–12	6–6	Charleston, WV
February 24, 1915*	at Charleston YMCA	W 50–29	7–6	Charleston, WV
February 25, 1915*	at Huntington Presbyterian	W 42–19	8–6	Huntington, WV
February 27, 1915*	Marietta	W 22–19	9–6	Morgantown, WV
March 4, 1915*	at Carnegie Tech	L 31–38	9–7	Pittsburgh, PA
March 5, 1915*	at Washington & Jefferson	L 27–31	9–8	Washington, PA
March 6, 1915*	at Bethany	L 20–36	9–9	Bethany, PA
March 12, 1915*	at West Virginia Wesleyan	L 21–37	9–10	Buckhannon, WV
March 13, 1915*	at Fairmont YMCA	W 37–26	10–10	Fairmont, WV
*Non-conference game. (#) Tournament seedings in parentheses.
