= Edward Donahue =

American sports coach and administrator (1891–1961)

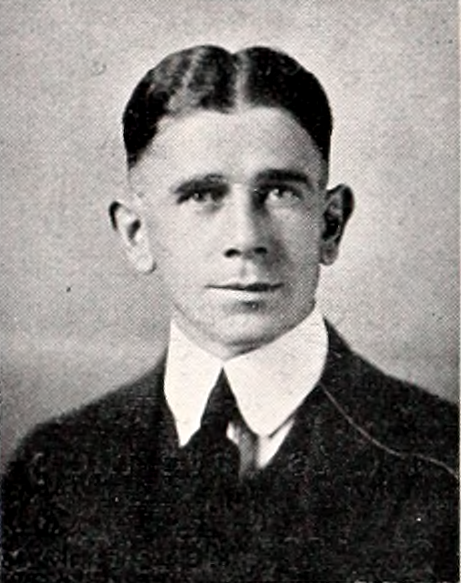
- Donahue at Clemson in 1920

Biographical details
- Born: February 5, 1891; Somerville, Massachusetts, U.S.
- Died: October 29, 1961 (aged 70); Boston, Massachusetts, U.S.

Playing career

Football
- 1914: Washington and Lee

Baseball
- c. 1915: Washington and Lee
- 1924: Dover Senators
- Positions: Quarterback (football); Catcher (baseball)

Coaching career (HC unless noted)

Football
- 1915–1916: Washington and Lee (assistant)
- 1917–1920: Clemson
- 1931: Western Reserve (backfield)

Basketball
- 1916–1917: Washington and Lee
- 1917–1919: Clemson

Baseball
- 1918–1919: Clemson
- 1923–1926: Dover Senators
- 1927: Easton Farmers
- 1928: Martinsburg Blue Sox
- 1928: Cambridge Canners
- 1937: Dover Orioles
- 1938: Greenville Spinners
- 1940: Hollywood Chiefs

Administrative career (AD unless noted)
- 1917–1920: Clemson

Head coaching record
- Overall: 21–12–3 (college football); 19–3 (college basketball); 17–21–1 (college baseball)

Edward Ambrose "Jiggs" Donahue (Note: Not to be confused with major-league baseball players John A. "Jiggs" Donahue (1879–1913) and John F. "Jiggs" Donahue (1894–1949).) (February 5, 1891 – October 29, 1961) was an American football and baseball player, coach of multiple sports, and college athletics administrator. He served as the head football coach at Clemson University from 1917 to 1920, compiling a record of 21–12–3 (.625). He also served as the school's basketball and baseball coach, as well as the track coach. Donahue joined the football coaching staff at Western Reserve University in 1931, serving as the backfield coach under head coach Tom Keady.

Donahue attended Somerville High School in Somerville, Massachusetts and Mercersburg Academy in Mercersburg, Pennsylvania. At Washington and Lee University in Lexington, Virginia he starred in baseball as a catcher. Donahue died on October 29, 1961, in Boston, at the age of 70.

== Head coaching record ==
=== College football ===
Year	Team	Overall	Conference	Standing	Bowl/playoffs
Clemson Tigers (Southern Intercollegiate Athletic Association) (1917–1920)
1917	Clemson	6–2	5–1	T–2nd	
1918	Clemson	5–2	3–1	4th	
1919	Clemson	6–2–2	3–2–2	11th	
1920	Clemson	4–6–1	2–6	17th	
Clemson:		21–12–3	13–10–2		
Total:		21–12–3			
