= 1914–15 Kent State Normal School men's basketball team =

American college basketball season

1914–15 Kent State Normal School men's basketball
- Conference: Independent
- Record: 3–2
- Head coach: Alexander Whyte (2nd season)

The 1914–15 Kent State Normal School men's basketball team was the men's basketball team at what is now Kent State University in Kent, Ohio, then known as Kent State Normal School.

The men's basketball team scheduled eight games in early 1915 of which five were played, and for the first time the competition included nearby colleges. Three games were played against local club teams, the Maroons of Kent and the Ravenna All-Stars, and all three of these games were victories for Normal.

There was not yet an established nickname for teams from the school, and the school colors were the original orange and blue. Alexander Whyte, the campus custodian, served in his second and last year as head coach. Ed. Jerosky served as team captain with Paul R. Swigart as manager. The starting five were Swigart (left guard), Sol Schneider (right guard), Louis Cort (left forward), Jerosky (right forward) and H.K. Carpenter (center).

Early basketball games were held in various locations, such as the atrium of the original Administration Building (known as Cartwright Hall since 2006), in the basement of the original heating plant, and in the local Congregational Church gymnasium, as a permanent gymnasium was not built on campus until 1925.

== Schedule and results ==
Date time, TV	Opponent	Result	Record	Site city, state
Friday; January 22, 1915*	Otterbein	L 5–56	0–1	Kent, OH
Friday; January 29, 1915*	Kent Maroons	W 24–19	1–1	Kent, OH
Friday; February 5, 1915*	Kent Maroons	W 27–23	2–1	Kent, OH
Thursday; February 11, 1915*	Muskingum	L 18–54	2–2	Kent, OH
Tuesday; February 16, 1915*	Hiram	cancelled		Kent, OH
Tuesday; February 23, 1915*	Ravenna All-Stars	W 28–11	3–2	Kent, OH
Friday; February 26, 1915*	Ohio Northern	cancelled		Kent, OH
Thursday; March 4, 1915*	Wittenberg	cancelled		Kent, OH
*Non-conference game. (#) Tournament seedings in parentheses. Sources

== See also ==
- List of Kent State Golden Flashes men's basketball seasons
