= 1918–19 Georgia Bulldogs basketball team =

American college basketball season

1918–19 Georgia Bulldogs basketball
- Conference: Southern Intercollegiate Athletic Association
- Record: 5–3 (1–2 SIAA)
- Head coach: Kennon Mott (1st season)
- Captain: A. H. Cox

The 1918–19 Georgia Bulldogs basketball team represented the University of Georgia as a member of the Southern Intercollegiate Athletic Association (SIAA) during the 1918–19 NCAA men's basketball season. Led by Kennon Mott in first and only season as head coach, the Bulldogs compiled an overall record of 5–3 with a mark of 1–2 in conference play. The team captain was A. H. Cox.

== Schedule ==
Date time, TV	Opponent	Result	Record	Site city, state
1/17/1919*	Auburn	L 20–25	0–1	Athens, GA
1/25/1919*	Macon YMCA	W 51–20	1–1	Athens, GA
1/29/1919*	at Auburn	L 22–35	1–2	The Gymnasium; Auburn, AL
1/31/1919*	Clemson	W 31–12	2–2	Athens, GA
2/3/1919*	at Macon YMCA	W 39–33	3–2	
2/8/1919*	Birmingham A.C.	W 36–12	4–2	Athens, GA
2/22/1919*	A.A.C.	W 27–22	5–2	Athens, GA
3/1/1919*	at A.A.C	L 15–32	5–3	
*Non-conference game. (#) Tournament seedings in parentheses.
