= 1914–15 William & Mary Indians men's basketball team =

American college basketball season

1914–15 William & Mary Indians men's basketball
- Conference: Independent
- Record: 5–8
- Head coach: Dexter W. Draper (2nd season)

The 1914–15 William & Mary Indians men's basketball team represented the College of William & Mary in intercollegiate basketball during the 1914–15 season. Under the second year of head coach Dexter W. Draper, the team finished the season with a 5–8 record. This was the 10th season in program history for William & Mary, whose nickname is now the Tribe.

== Schedule ==
Date time, TV	Rank^{#}	Opponent^{#}	Result	Record	Site city, state
Regular season
*		Richmond Howitzers	L 16–37	0–1	Williamsburg, VA
*		Fort Monroe 58th Company	W 55–18	1–1	Williamsburg, VA
*		USS Utah	L 30–45	1–2	Williamsburg, VA
*		Newport News YMCA	W 28–21	2–2	Williamsburg, VA
*		Randolph–Macon	L 7–31	2–3	Williamsburg, VA
2/13/1915*		at Richmond	L 17–22	2–4	Richmond, VA
*		Randolph–Macon	L 26–40	2–5	Williamsburg, VA
*		Norfolk Seminary	L 25–65	2–6	Williamsburg, VA
*		VMI	L 13–24	2–7	Williamsburg, VA
*		Staunton Military	L 16–35	2–8	Williamsburg, VA
*		Hampden–Sydney	W 40–23	3–8	Williamsburg, VA
3/3/1915*		at Richmond	W 29–27	4–8	Williamsburg, VA
*		Hampden–Sydney	W 42–35	5–8	Williamsburg, VA
*Non-conference game. ^{#}Rankings from AP Poll. (#) Tournament seedings in parentheses.
