= 1916–17 Kent State Normal College men's basketball team =

American college basketball season

1916–17 Kent State Normal College men's basketball
- Conference: Independent
- Record: 2–6
- Head coach: Donald Ulrich (2nd season)

The 1916–17 Kent State Normal College men's basketball team was the men's basketball team at what is now Kent State University in Kent, Ohio, then known as Kent State Normal College.

The men's basketball team played eight games in late 1916 and early 1917, losing the first seven, finishing with a record of 2–6. The team also played four games against a local company team and local high schools, finishing the year with an overall record of 4–8. It was the second and final year for coach Dr. Donald Ulrich. No team would be fielded during the next two war year seasons.

There was not yet an established nickname for teams for the college, and the school colors were the original orange and blue. Herbert “Sweeney” Swigart served as team captain with Gilbert Roberts as manager. The team roster comprised Swigart (left guard), C.L. Miley (right guard) Jerosky (right guard), Louis Bechtle (left forward), James Tidd (right forward), Elmslie Thomas (center), Charles Molien and Omar Kear.

Games were held in various locations, such as the atrium of the original Administration Building (known as Cartwright Hall since 2006), in the basement of the original heating plant, and in the local Congregational Church gymnasium, as a permanent gymnasium was not built on campus until 1925.

== Schedule and results ==
| Date time, TV | Opponent | Result | Record | Site city, state |
|---|---|---|---|---|
| December 15, 1916* | Ashland | L 11–55 | 0–1 | Kent, OH |
| January 12, 1917* | Western Reserve Academy | W 23–20 | 1–1 | Kent, OH |
| January 19, 1917* | Bowling Green | W 19–17 | 2–1 | Kent, OH |
| January 20, 1917* | at St. Ignatius | L 8–61 | 2–2 | Cleveland, OH |
| January 24, 1917* | at Ashland | Cancelled | | Ashland, OH |
| February 10, 1917* | at Akron | L 4–62 | 2-3 | Akron, OH |
| March 2, 1917* | at Muskingum | L 11–69 | 2–4 | New Concord, OH |
| March 9, 1917* | at Bowling Green | L 17–51 | 2–5 | Bowling Green, OH |
| March 10, 1917* | Findlay | L 12–100 | 2–6 | Kent, OH |
*Non-conference game. (#) Tournament seedings in parentheses. Sources

== See also ==
- List of Kent State Golden Flashes men's basketball seasons
