= 1918–19 Cincinnati Bearcats men's basketball team =

American college basketball season

1918–19 Cincinnati Bearcats men's basketball
- Conference: Ohio Athletic Conference
- Record: 3–11 (1–7 OAC)
- Head coach: Boyd Chambers (1st season)
- Captain: Albert Goodman
- Home arena: Schmidlapp Gymnasium

The 1918–19 Cincinnati Bearcats men's basketball team represented the University of Cincinnati during the 1918–19 college men's basketball season. The head coach was Boyd Chambers, coaching his first season with the Bearcats.

== Schedule ==
Date time, TV	Opponent	Result	Record	Site city, state
January 3	Ft. Thomas (KY)	W 28–18	1–0	Schmidlapp Gymnasium; Cincinnati, OH
January 10	Capital	L 21–28	1–1	Schmidlapp Gymnasium; Cincinnati, OH
January 17	Kenyon	W 29–19	2–1	Schmidlapp Gymnasium; Cincinnati, OH
January 22	Ohio Wesleyan	L 22–38	2–2	Schmidlapp Gymnasium; Cincinnati, OH
January 25	at Miami (OH)	L 14–17	2–3	Oxford, OH
January 31	Kentucky	W 28–18	3–3	Schmidlapp Gymnasium; Cincinnati, OH
February 6	at Denison	L 14–35	3–4	Granville, OH
February 7	at Capital	L 17–43	3–5	Bexley, OH
February 8	at Ohio Wesleyan	L 18–32	3–6	Delaware, OH
February 17	Indiana	L 24–38	3–7	Schmidlapp Gymnasium; Cincinnati, OH
February 21	at Kentucky	L 21–34	3–8	Buell Armory Gymnasium; Lexington, KY
February 27	at Wittenberg	L 11–42	3–9	Springfield, OH
March 1	at Denison	L 16–28	3–10	Granville, OH
March 7	at Miami (OH)	L 17–23	3–11	Oxford, OH
*Non-conference game. (#) Tournament seedings in parentheses.
