= Herman Koehler =

American football coach, athletics administrator, and United States Army officer

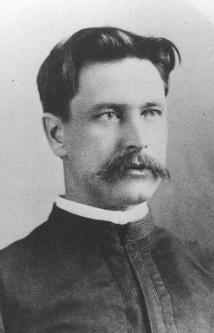

Biographical details
- Born: December 14, 1859; Milwaukee, Wisconsin
- Died: July 1, 1927 (aged 67); Manhattan, New York City, New York

Coaching career (HC unless noted)
- 1897–1900: Army

Head coaching record
- Overall: 19–11–3
- Military career
- Branch: United States Army
- Service years: 1901–1923
- Rank: Lieutenant Colonel
- Conflicts: World War I
- Awards: Distinguished Service Medal

Herman John Koehler (December 14, 1859 – July 1, 1927) was an American football coach, athletics administrator, and United States Army officer. He served as the head football coach at the United States Military Academy from 1897 to 1900, compiling a record of 19–11–3.

Koehler was also the Master of the Sword from 1885 to 1923 and director of West Point's first program of physical education instruction. Due to his long-serving tenure and his impact on the Department of Physical Education, he is held in high regard and is considered the "father of the Department of Physical Education" at West Point. His daughter Beatrix was the wife of Major General Edmund L. Daley and mother of Lieutenant General John P. Daley. Koehler is buried in the West Point Cemetery.

== Biography ==
Koehler was born in Milwaukee, Wisconsin on December 14, 1859. A second generation German-American, Koehler was an 1882 graduate of the Milwaukee Normal School of Physical Training (a Turnvereine school) and worked as Director of School Gymnastics for the Oshkosh, Wisconsin city schools from 1882 to 1885. A member of the Milwaukee Turners, Koehler revitalized their programs by professionalizing instruction and expanding the visibility of physical training both locally and nationally. His success as a competitive gymnast and educator helped elevate the Turner tradition and bring it to wider prominence. He had also become well known for competing on the national and international level in gymnastics, finishing first against a field of 300 at an event in Frankfurt am Main, Germany in 1881.

=== West Point career ===
On February 1, 1885 Superintendent of the United States Military Academy Col. Wesley Merritt appointed him as a civilian to the position of Master of the Sword. Professor Koehler implemented a systematic program of physical education, compulsory for cadets of the fourth class, and became the driving force in-house for a new gymnasium, which was completed in 1892.

His first program included strength tests and anthropometric measurements of cadets. The physical education curriculum he instituted included not just fencing, but also gymnastics, swimming, dancing, and equestrian arts. Swimming in particular was a welcomed inclusion by the cadets and became a rite of passage. The calisthenics program, mandatory for plebes, was grounded in the Turnvereine philosophy, conducted in mass formation stressing precise execution, good posture, and energetic flair, but never performed to the point of exhaustion. Based on his initial experiences, in 1887 he authored a text, A System of Calisthenic Exercises for Use in the School of the Soldier, whose provisions were adopted Army-wide in 1892 as The Manual of Calisthenic Exercises. His system of "setting up" exercises (later termed "Disciplinary Physical Training") concentrated on strengthening a soldier's shoulders, chest, arms, and legs.

In 1889 the USMA Board of Visitors praised his work and recommended that he be commissioned, stating that he was "doing unaided the duties...of three or four instructors at the Naval Academy." However, not until the 1899–1900 class year did he receive an assistant in instruction, and not until 1901 was he direct-commissioned as a first lieutenant of Infantry and transferred to the Department of Tactics as "instructor in military gymnastics and physical culture. The position of Master of the Sword thereafter has been held since only by members of the Regular Army, all of whom have also been graduates of West Point. In 1895 Koehler began lobbying academy superintendents that physical education be compulsory for all four cadet classes but was unsuccessful until he gained the support of Commandant of Cadets Col. Charles G. Treat. In 1905, when boxing and wrestling were added to the curriculum, Superintendent Brig. Gen. Albert L. Mills made such training mandatory for the entire Corps of Cadets.

From his first days at the academy Koehler promoted Army's participation in intercollegiate athletics, a move resisted by the Academic Board until 1890, when Army was challenged to a game of football by Navy. Army lost the inaugural Army–Navy Game by a score of 24–0. Koehler also fostered intramural sports as a third leg of his physical education philosophy using academic good standing as a requisite to provide an educational incentive, but such sports remained voluntarily until 1920 when Brig. Gen. Douglas MacArthur became superintendent. A more modern gymnasium, still existing today as the Hayes Gymnasium, was constructed in 1910.

In addition to his academy duties, Koehler helped found a recruit school for the New York Police Department in 1913, provided instruction for state militia regiments of New York and Massachusetts from 1911 to 1913, and instructed New York Army National Guard units called up to duty in 1916 as a result of the Pancho Villa Expedition.

Prior to the entry of the United States into World War I, Koehler was detached to direct physical instruction for 200,000 newly inducted soldiers at officers' and divisional training camps of the National Army and promoted to major. He personally led instruction to units as large as a brigade, often conducting calisthenics to 6,000 men at a time. The United States Army Physical Fitness School estimated in 1999 that during his lifetime Koehler led physical instruction for more than 400,000 persons. Promoted to lieutenant colonel, he was awarded the Distinguished Service Medal in 1919 for his wartime service.

In 1919 he published his second text, Koehler's West Point Manual of Disciplinary Physical Training, in which he advocated not only his system of exercises adopted at West Point but the use of marching, double timing, rifle exercises, bayonet drill, vaulting, and obstacle courses for physical conditioning that became a regular feature of basic military training.

Following his mandatory retirement from the Army (and his position as Master of the Sword) on his 64th birthday in 1923, Koehler wrote:

"Leadership, superior physical qualifications and the ability to discharge intelligently every phase of military training, particularly that pertaining to the physical conditioning of men, are some of the qualifications that the experience of the war are demanding of the graduates of the Academy."

Koehler's 39-year tenure at West Point saw the introduction of professional athletic instructors, a systematic program of instruction, a curriculum for physical education, an adequate facility, manuals, and widespread acceptance of the program by both the staff and cadets of the academy. For that the first Master of the Sword to direct the Department of Physical Education, Lt. Col. Francis M. Greene, was prompted in 1948 to describe Koehler as the "real father of the West Point Department of Physical Education."

=== Later life ===
On July 1, 1927, Koehler died at the Polyclinic Hospital on West 50th Street in Manhattan, New York City, where he had gone for an operation. He was interred at the West Point Cemetery four days later.

== In media ==
In 1955, Ward Bond played Koehler in John Ford's motion picture The Long Gray Line.

== Head coaching record ==
Koehler's teams played Navy twice, in 1899 and 1900, each team recording a victory.

Year	Team	Overall	Conference	Standing	Bowl/playoffs
Army Cadets (Independent) (1897–1900)
1897	Army	5–1–1			
1898	Army	3–2–1			
1899	Army	4–5			
1900	Army	7–3–1			
Army:		19–11–3			
Total:		19–11–3			
