= Sri Gowthami Degree and PG College =

Sri Gowthami Educational Institutions (SGEIs)
- Sri Gowthami Degree & PG College
- Main College
- Motto: "Lead to wisdom, knowledge and development"
- Type: Autonomous, Co-education, Arts & Science, Technical and Training Colleges (College/ITI)
- Established: 2000
- Chairman: Sri. Kanumarla Gunda Reddy, M. A; M. Phil (KGR)
- Location: Podili Road, Darsi 522 001, India, Darsi, Prakasam District, Andhra Pradesh, India; 15.7667°N 79.6833°E
- Campus: Suburban and Rural; Board of Intermediate Education, Abids, Hyderabad; Acharya Nagarjuna University, Nagarjunanagar, Guntur district, Andhra Pradesh, India; NCTE, Bangalore; APSCHE, Hyderabad; SCERT, AP; DGT, M of SDAE, Govt. of India
- Location in Andhra Pradesh, India

Sri Gowthami Degree and PG College is a pioneering Under graduate and Post Graduate College at Darsi in Prakasam district, Andhra Pradesh, South India. It is the first college among the group of Sri Gowthami Educational Institutions (SGEIs) in Prakasam district, Andhra Pradesh State, established by the educationalist and social activist, Kanumarla Gunda Reddy in the year 2000. It is being managed and run by Sri Gowthami Urban and Rural Integrated Development and Educational Society (SGURID&ES, 412/2000).

== A Fleeting Historical Portrayal of SGEIs ==
Sri Gowthami Educational Institutions are being run under "SGURID & ES". The first institution of SGEIs was started in 2000; "Sri Gowthami Junior College" at Darsi in Prakasam district with few rural villages’ students. Later responding to the civic need, SGURID & ES extended its institutional services to further elaboration of establishing Sri Gowthami Degree College in 2005. Understanding the lack of training colleges or institutions for the teaching and educationalist postulants of Darsi and surrounding Mandals, it started "Sri Gowthami College of Education" in 2006, followed by in the year 2010 started Post Graduate College "Sri Gowthami PG College" and in the succeeding year in 2011, SGEIs started PG Course in Mathematics. In 2012, SGEI it started "Sri Gowthami Junior & Degree College" at Erragondapalem, Prakasam district, AP. In the year 2013 "Sri Gowthami Degree Colleges" at Santhanuthalapadu and Donakonda and it also upgraded to PG Education in M.Sc. Statistics and M.Com. too and thus it offers all subjects in B. A, B.Com. and B.Sc. and in PG courses in both English and Telugu Medium of instruction. It also runs three ITI colleges at Darsi, Kanigiri and Podili for the technical and professional skill-development of the aspirant youths. The society also provides free education to the poorest of the poor and handicapped children of all castes especially the SC/ST students and participates in social/voluntary services too. Besides the on campus and regular courses, it also take-up distant studies and courses in all UG and PG standards.

== Affiliations, Academic and Extra-Academic Status ==
SGEIs Chairman Sri. Gunda Reddy hands over cash cheque to the Minister towards Chief Minister's Disaster Relief Fund

Sri Gowthami Educational Institutions are affiliated to Acharya Nagarjuna University (ANU), Guntur and Board of Intermediate Education primarily. And its professional, skill development and technical institutions and colleges are affiliated to National Council for Technical Education (NCTE), Bangalore, APSCHE, Hyderabad, SCERT, DGET (NCVT) Govt. of India and both are also recognized by the respective affiliations of the Government of Andhra Pradesh and Government of India (Board of Intermediate Education etc.)

Besides molding national level standardized and capacitated professionals in rural areas, the SGEIs also trains professionals with Social Responsibility and National Integration through its NSS, voluntary social services, campaigns, blood donations, health camps, Disaster Relief Supports and all injured from the campus itself. It also conducts Yoga, Meditation, observation of socially important days, participation and conducting of different sports items in and off-campuses, state/national level competitions too.

== Departments ==
- Department of Botany
- Department of Chemistry
- Department of Commerce
- Department of Computer Science
- Department of Economics
- Department of English
- Department of Geography
- Department of History
- Department of Library Science
- Department of Mathematics
- Department of Microbiology
- Department of Bio-Technology
- Department of Physical Education
- Department of Physics
- Department of Political Science
- Department of Statistics
- Department of Telugu
- Department of Zoology
- Department of Chemistry
- Department of Teachers’ Training
- Department of Technical Education

== SGEI Colleges and Courses ==
S. No	Name of the Institution	Year Estd	Courses	Location
1	Sri Gowthami Junior College	2000	Intermediate	PodiliRoad, Darsi,
2	Sri Gowthami Degree & PG College	2005	B.Sc, B.Com. and B.A	PodiliRoad, Darsi,
3	Sri Gowthami College of Education	2007	B.Ed (All Methodologies)	Podili Road, Darsi
4	Sri Gowthami D.Ed. College	2012	D.Ed (TTC)	Podili Road, Darsi
5	Sri Gowthami Junior College	2012	Intermediate	Yerragondapalem
6	Sri Gowthami Degree College	2012	B.Sc., B.Com. and B.A	Yerragondapalem
7	Sri Gowthami Degree College	2013	B.Sc. and B.Com	Santhanuthalapadu
8	Sri Gowthami Degree College	2014	B.Com. and B.A	Donakonda
9	KGR ITI	2009	Electrician & Diesel Mechanic	Podili Road, Darsi
10	Tilak ITI	2009	Electrician & Diesel Mechanic	Chimakurthi
11	Sri Gowthami ITI	2012	Draftsman (Civil) & Electrician	Thripuranthakam
12	Universal ITI	2009	Draftsman (Civil) & Electrician	Yerragondapalem
13	KGR ITI	2009	Draftsman (Civil) & Electrician	Cumbum
14	KGR ITI	2012	Draftsman (Civil) & Electrician	Besthavaripeta
15	Universal Degree College	2013	B.Sc. and B.Com.	Yerragondapalem

== Facilities ==
Main Campus where there three colleges situated is of a total 4 acres land comprising about 2, 13,000 Sq.fts. built area, open land and ground with play and sports’ paces for both men and women. There is also a Department of Physical Education which organizes coaching camps and training in major sports and games items.
