= Obstacle course =

Series of physical obstacles, navigated for sport

An obstacle course is a series of challenging physical obstacles an individual, team or animal must navigate, usually while being timed. Obstacle courses can include running, climbing, jumping, crawling, swimming, and balancing elements with the aim of testing speed, endurance and agility. Sometimes a course involves mental tests. The idea has been adapted into TV shows (such as Superstars, American Ninja Warrior and Wipeout) and video games (such as Fall Guys).

== Types of courses ==
=== Military ===
The military/Army obstacle course is used (mostly in recruit training) as a way to familiarize recruits with the kind of tactical movement they will use in combat, as well as for physical training, building teamwork, and evaluating problem solving skills. Typical courses involve obstacles the participants must climb over, crawl under, balance, hang, jump, etc. Puddles of muddy water, ropes/nets, and "no touch" restrictions are often used to make the course more difficult. Often, specialized courses are made to focus on specific needs, such as night movement, assault, and bayonet training. Military courses can also contain climbing walls and rappelling walls.

At the Royal Military College of Canada in Kingston, Ontario, officer cadets in first year participate in an obstacle course, which is designed by senior cadets. The obstacle course lasts a little over an hour and consists of thirteen obstacles built by each squadron located around the RMC grounds. Obstacles such as a 12-foot (3.7 m) wall and truck pulling are designed to test teamwork and physical fitness of First Years. The First Year flights are judged on the time it takes to complete each obstacle. The annual obstacle course race is memorialized by a sculpture by John Boxtel, "To Overcome", which was a gift of the class of 1991. Officer Cadets in third year take a physical education courses Obstacle Course and Water Borne Training. In the Obstacle course, cadets design obstacles with the available equipment and are evaluated on their leadership and innovation in the design of an obstacle course for their classmates. In the WB training, cadets learn about aquatic obstacle courses training and improve their basic swimming skills.

At the United States Military Academy at West Point, NY, Cadets must take and pass the Indoor Obstacle Course Test (IOCT). The test consists of 11 obstacles that must be navigated sequentially and is a vigorous test of total body fitness and high intensity cardio-vascular capacity. First year Cadets take the IOCT as part of mandatory gymnastics training, while Third Year Cadets must pass the IOCT as a stand-alone test of fitness.

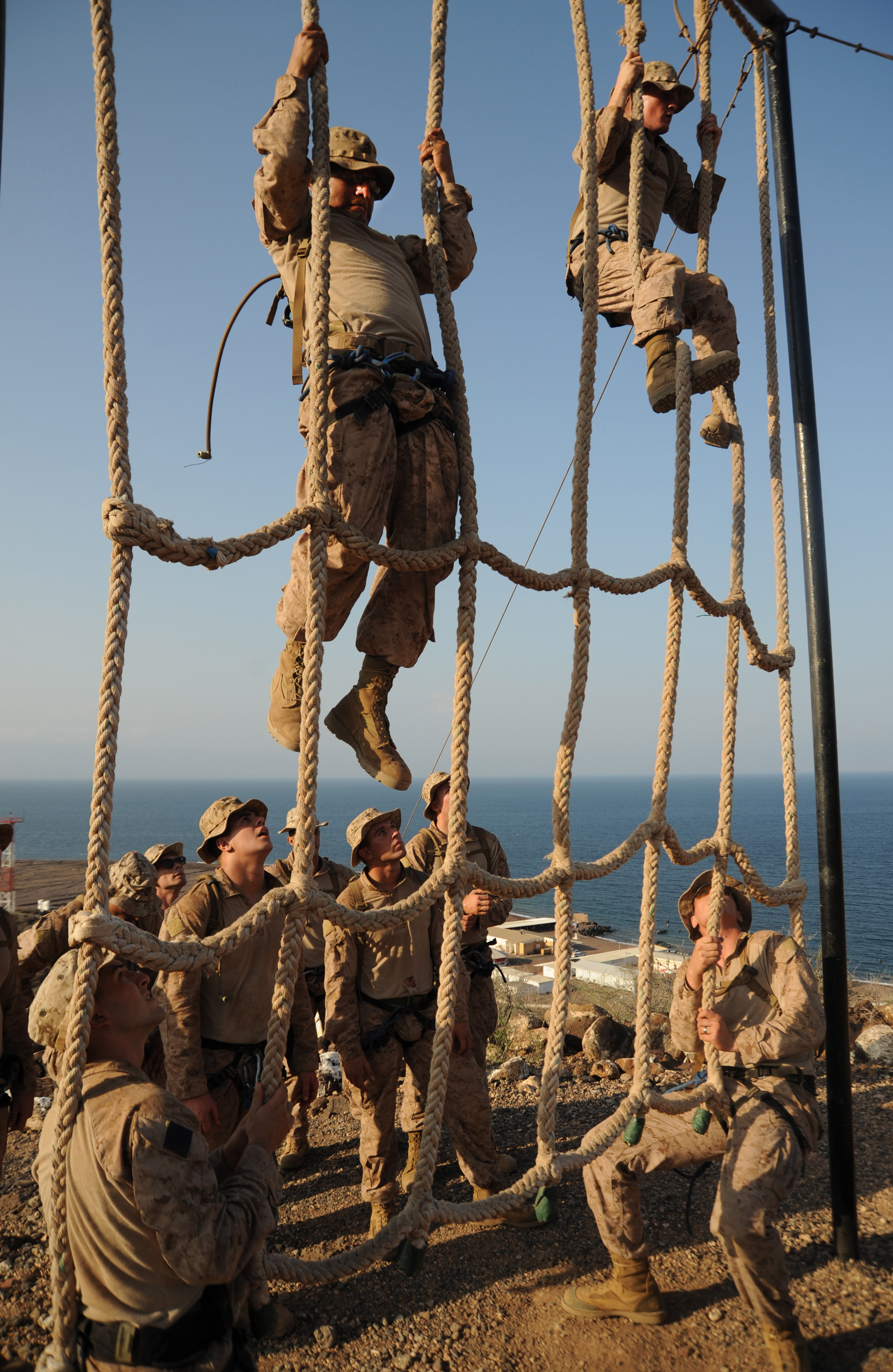
At the Combat Training Center at Arta Beach

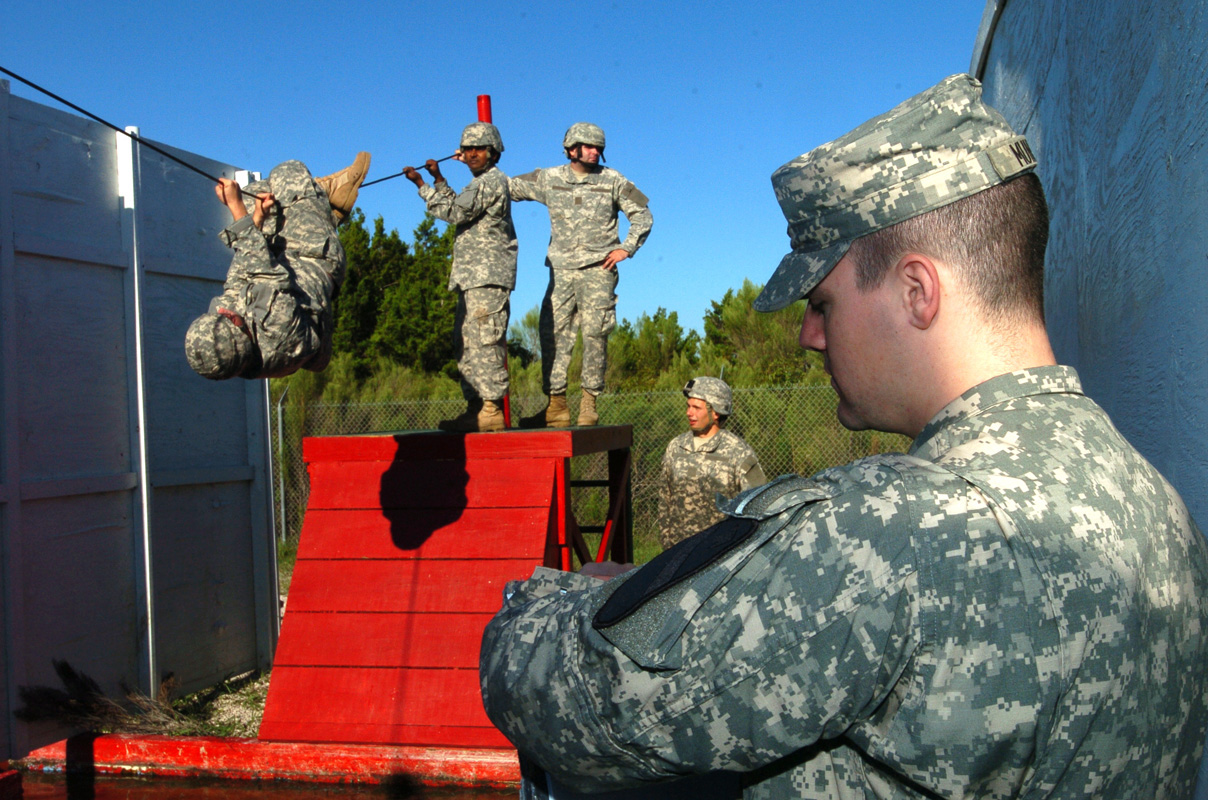
Leaders Reaction Course at Fort Cavazos, Texas

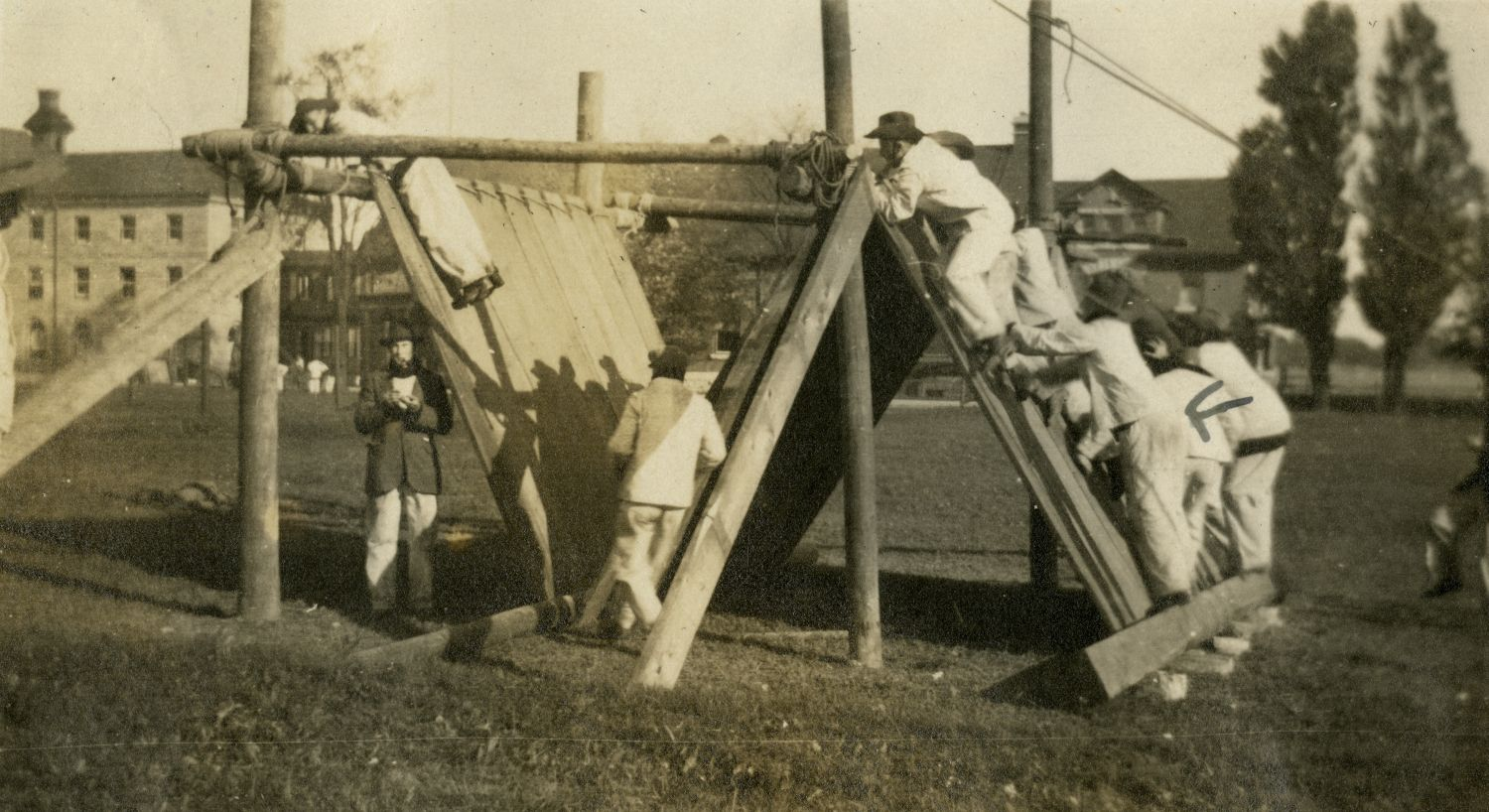
Obstacle-course training at the Royal Military College of Canada c. 1917

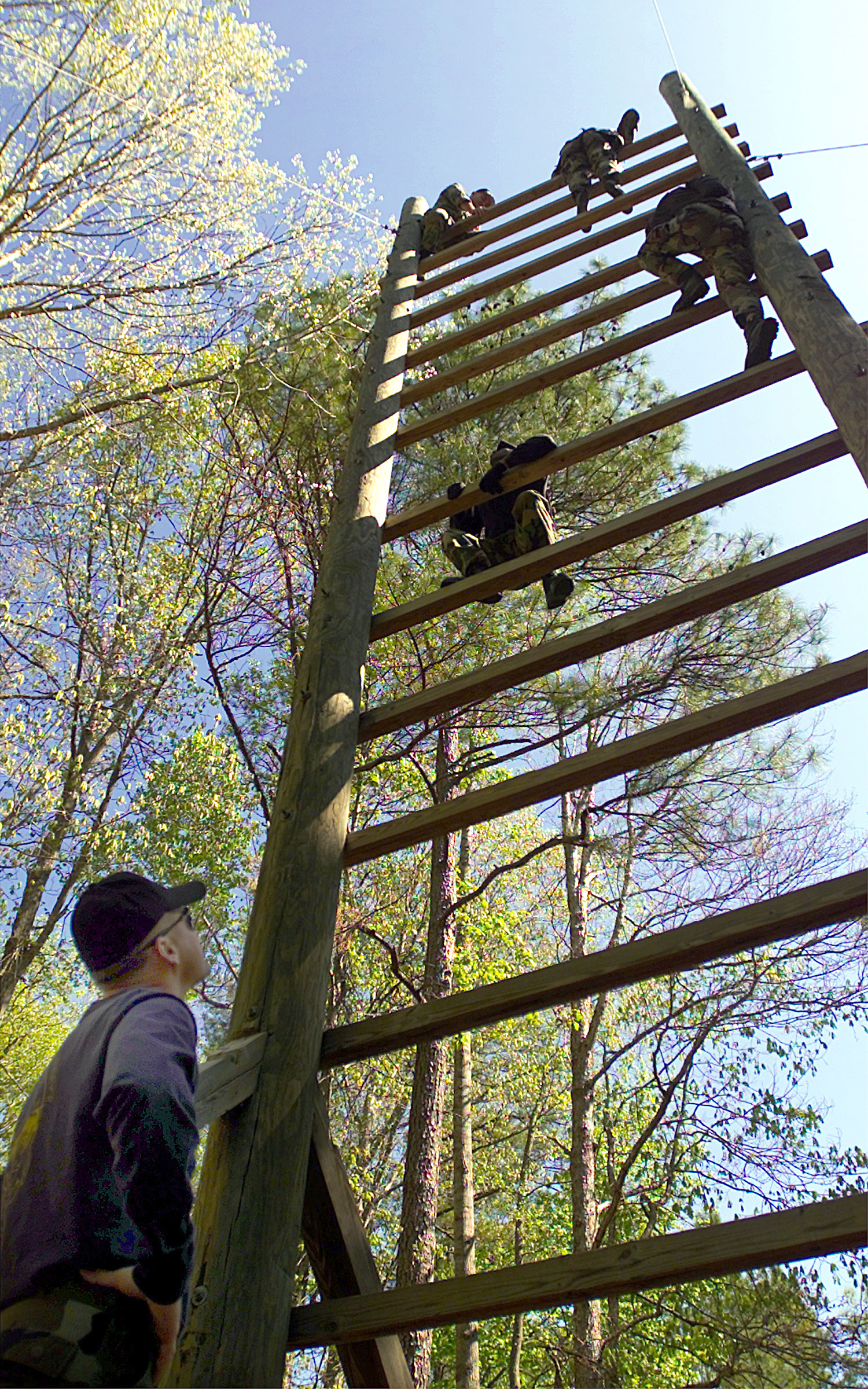
"Stairs" obstacle at Fort Barfoot, Virginia

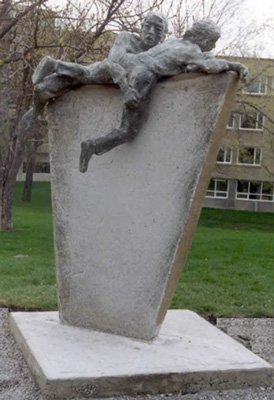
The annual obstacle course race at Royal Military College of Canada is memorialized by a sculpture by John Boxtel, To Overcome, which was a gift from the 1991 graduating class

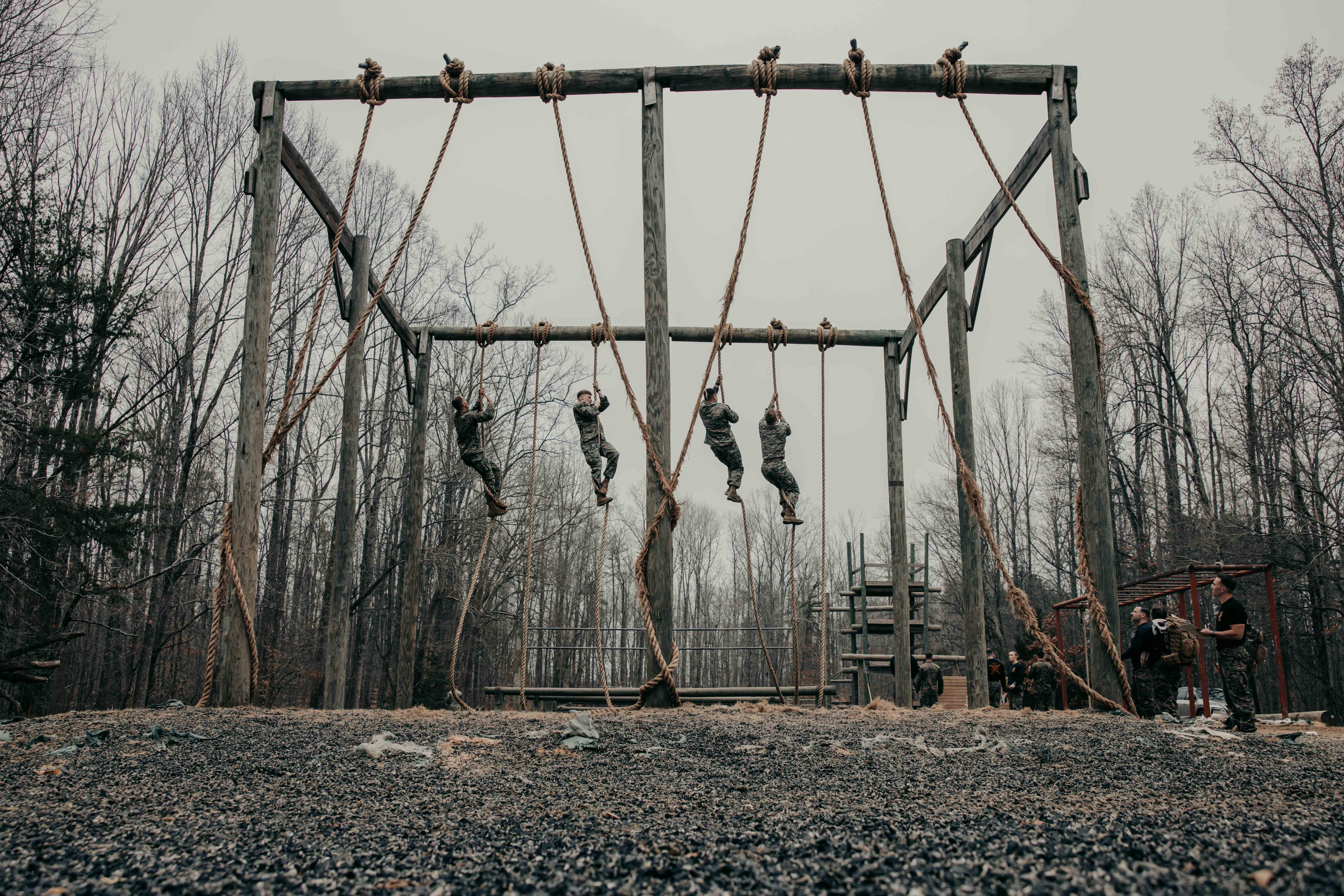
Obstacle course evaluation at The Basic School on Marine Corps Base Quantico

=== Inflatable ===
Inflatable (air filled) obstacle courses can have participants go through a variety of areas like the Bish Bash, a tall loose structure to push or wade through, nets to crawl under, walls to climb over and holes to jump through. Some larger inflatables have even more areas.

=== Assault ===
An assault obstacle course can be done inside or outside. The outside course is usually messy and filled with mud and muddy water. An inside course is similar to an inflatable course, but it is used in physical education lessons or holiday camps, using gym equipment or whatever is at hand.

=== Commercial ===
Several indoor commercial indoor recreation and trampoline park companies have begun to include obstacle courses at their facilities, in many cases because of demand generated by television shows such as American Ninja Warrior, according to The Wall Street Journal.

== See also ==
- Aerial adventure park
- Assault course
- Obstacle Course Racing
- Dog agility
- Freerunning
- Georges Hébert (1875–1957)
- Outdoor gym
- Obstacle racing
- Parkour
- Platform video game
- Ropes course
- Steeplechase (athletics)
- Street workout
- Trainasium
- Modern pentathlon
