= Edmund L. Daley =

U.S. Army major general

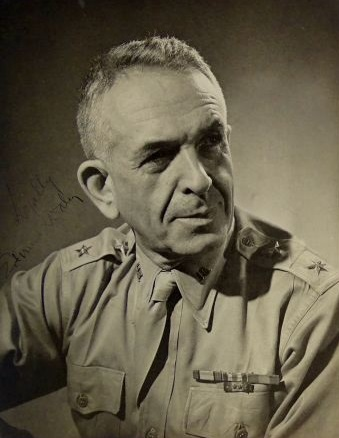
- Daley as a major general, circa 1942
- Born: November 1, 1883; Worcester, Massachusetts, U.S.
- Died: December 19, 1968 (aged 85); Albany, New York, U.S.
- Burial place: West Point Cemetery
- Education: United States Military Academy; United States Army Command and General Staff College; United States Army War College
- Spouse: Beatrix Otillie Koehler (m. 1906–1928)
- Children: 3
- Relatives: Herman J. Koehler (father-in-law); John P. Daley (son)
- Military career
- Service: United States Army
- Service years: 1906–1942
- Rank: Major General
- Service number: O2118
- Unit: U.S. Army Corps of Engineers
- Commands: Company D, 1st Engineer Battalion, 55th Engineer Regiment; 6th Engineer Regiment; Military Governor of Nakhchivan and Sharur; Pittsburgh Engineer District; Upper Mississippi Valley Engineer Division; 1st Engineer District of New York; North Atlantic Engineer Division; First Coast Artillery District; Puerto Rican Department; 2nd Infantry Division; V Corps
- Conflicts: Moro Rebellion; Pancho Villa Expedition; World War I Occupation of the Rhineland; Harbord Commission; Allied High Mission to Armenia; World War II
- Awards: Army Distinguished Service Medal; Silver Star; Order of Agricultural Merit (Officer) (France); Order of the Redeemer (Gold Cross) (Greece)
- Other work: New York State Deputy Director of Civil Defense; New York State Deputy Director of Veterans Affairs

Edmund L. Daley (November 1, 1883 – December 19, 1968) was a career officer in the United States Army. A veteran of the Moro Rebellion, Pancho Villa Expedition, World War I and World War II, he was a recipient of the Army Distinguished Service Medal, Silver Star, French Order of Agricultural Merit (Officer), and Greek Order of the Redeemer (Gold Cross). Daley was assigned to the U.S. Army Corps of Engineers, and his command postings included the 55th Engineer Regiment, 6th Engineer Regiment, Pittsburgh Engineer District, Upper Mississippi Valley Engineer Division, North Atlantic Engineer Division, First Coast Artillery District, Puerto Rican Department, and V Corps.

A native of Worcester, Massachusetts, Daley graduated from high school in 1901 and obtained an appointment to the United States Military Academy (West Point) as a member of the class of 1906. His high graduation rank (fifth of 78) enabled him to obtain the assignment to the Corps of Engineers, and his early postings included Fort Mason, California and duty in the Philippines. As he continued to advance through the ranks, he served on the West Point faculty and attended the Army Service Schools (now the United States Army Command and General Staff College). During the First World War, he commanded the 6th Engineer Regiment, which he led during several offensives. Post-war assignments included the Harbord Commission in Turkey and Armenia, the Allied High Mission to Armenia, executive with the American Relief Administration that took part in relieving the Russian famine of 1921–1922, and deputy commissioner in Greece for the American Red Cross mission that implemented the Treaty of Lausanne to end the Greco-Turkish War of 1919 to 1922.

Daley was promoted to brigadier general after his graduation from the United States Army War College, and his senior assignments included command of Puerto Rican Department and V Corps. He was a major general when he was named to command United States Army Forces in Northern Ireland at the start of World War II, but the posting was subsequently withdrawn, and Daley opted to retire as a brigadier general. After retiring from the army, he resided in Albany, New York, where he served as New York State Deputy Director of Civil Defense and New York State Deputy Director of Veterans Affairs until retiring permanently in the mid-1950s. Daley died in Albany on December 19, 1968 and was buried at West Point Cemetery.

== Early life ==
Edmund Leo Daley was born in Worcester, Massachusetts on November 1, 1883, the son of John J. Daley and Katherine Elizabeth (Martin) Daley. He was raised and educated in Worcester, and was a 1901 graduate of Worcester's Classical High School.

After his high school graduation, Daley competed for a congressional appointment to the United States Military Academy at West Point. He scored highest on the examination offered by Representative John R. Thayer and received the appointment. Daley attended West Point from 1902 to 1906, and graduated fifth in his class of 78. Among his classmates who also became general officers were Jonathan M. Wainwright, Adna R. Chaffee Jr., Frank Maxwell Andrews, and Cortlandt Parker. He received his commission as a second lieutenant of Engineers and was posted to Fort Mason, California.

== Start of career ==
At Fort Mason, Daley was assigned to command Company D, 1st Engineer Battalion. From November 1907 to February 1908, he performed detached duty with surveying parties in the Philippines during the Moro Rebellion. He then resumed command of Company D, which he led at Fort William McKinley, Philippines until January 1909. Upon returning to the United States, he was a student at the Washington Barracks Engineer School until graduating in October 1910. He received promotion to first lieutenant in October 1909.

After graduating from the Engineer School, Daley resumed command of D Company, 1st Engineers, this time at Vancouver Barracks, Washington. In August 1911, he was assigned to the West Point faculty as an instructor in the Engineering Department, where he remained through August 1915. Daley was promoted to captain. From August 1915 to May 1916, Daley was a student in the Field Engineer Course at the Fort Leavenworth, Kansas Army Service Schools (now the United States Army Command and General Staff College). From May 1916 to June 1917, Daley was district engineer, depot engineer, and officer in charge of railway operations for the Laredo, Texas Engineer District, and oversaw rail transportation of soldiers and supplies during the Pancho Villa Expedition. He was promoted to major in June 1917.

== Continued career ==
At the start of World War I, Daley was assigned to Vancouver Barracks as senior instructor at the first Officers' Training Camp for engineers, and he served from June to August 1917. In August 1917, he received promotion to temporary lieutenant colonel and was assigned to the 310th Engineer Regiment during its organization and training at Camp Custer, Michigan. In March 1918, he was assigned to command the 55th Engineer Regiment at Camp Custer and in April 1918 he was promoted to temporary colonel. He led this regiment to France, and in June 1918 was assigned to command the 6th Engineer Regiment while serving concurrently as engineer officer on the staff of the 3rd Division. He participated in the August 1918 Aisne-Marne offensive, September 1918 Battle of Saint-Mihiel, and the September to November 1918 Meuse–Argonne offensive, and remained in command after the Armistice of November 11, 1918 ended the war.

Following the armistice, Daley took part in the Occupation of the Rhineland, then performed engineering duties at locations in France including the Le Mans Embarkation Area. From August to October 1919, he served with the Harbord Commission in Turkey and Armenia. From October 1919 to June 1920, he was a member of the Allied High Mission to Armenia, and served as military governor of the provinces of Nakhchivan and Sharur. In April 1920, he returned to his permanent rank of major. When he returned to the United States in July 1920, Daley traveled with a Polish American contingent of the Blue Army, a Polish force that took part in the war in Europe.

From August 1920 to August 1922, Daley served again on the West Point faculty, this time as professor of practical military engineering. From August to December 1922, he was an executive with the American Relief Administration, the Herbert Hoover-led effort to relieve the Russian famine of 1921–1922. From January to July 1923, Daley was deputy commissioner in Greece for the American Red Cross during implementation of the Treaty of Lausanne that resolved the Greco-Turkish War of 1919 to 1922.

== Later career ==
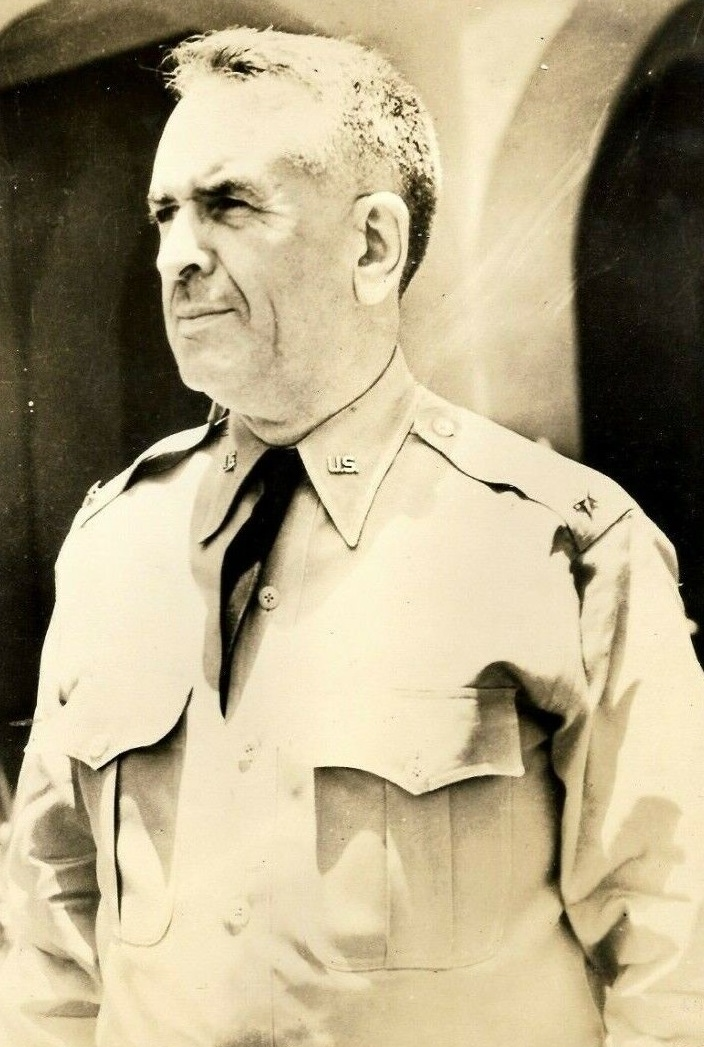
Daley as commander of the Puerto Rican Department in 1940

From August 1923 to August 1926, Daley was engineer officer of the Pittsburgh Engineer District. From August 1926 to August 1930, he served as assistant to the Chief of Engineers, with responsibility for the office's Permit Section and Rivers and Harbors Section. He received promotion to lieutenant colonel in November 1929. From September 1930 to November 1933, Daley was assistant division engineer for the Upper Mississippi Valley Engineer Division, and he was division engineer from November 1933 to August 1935, when he was promoted to colonel.

From August 1935 to June 1936, Daley was a student at the United States Army War College. After graduating, he was engineer officer of the 1st Engineer District of New York, a posting he held from June 1936 to June 1937. From June 1937 to September 1938, he served as engineer officer of the North Atlantic Engineer Division. In October 1938, Daley was promoted to brigadier general. He served as commander of the 1st Coast Artillery District from October 1938 to June 1939.

In July 1939, Daley was assigned to command the army's Puerto Rican Department. He served in this assignment until March 1941. From March to April 1941, he commanded of the 2nd Infantry Division, but with the army expanding after U.S. entry into World War II, he was quickly reassigned to command U.S. V Corps. He led the corps during organization and training at Camp Beauregard, Louisiana until September 1942, and was promoted to major general in May 1942. He was slated to command United States Army Forces in Northern Ireland, but the assignment was subsequently withdrawn by Army Chief of Staff George C. Marshall, who indicated he had received several reports indicating Daley's leadership style was not conducive to exercising high-level command, and insinuated a troubling personal failing, possibly alcoholism. Daley then requested retirement, and he left the army with the retired rank of brigadier general in September 1942.

== Awards ==
Daley's foreign awards included the Order of Agricultural Merit (Officer) (France) and Order of the Redeemer (Gold Cross) (Greece). His U.S. awards included the Army Distinguished Service Medal and Silver Star.

=== Army Distinguished Service Medal citation ===
"The President of the United States of America, authorized by Act of Congress, July 9, 1918, takes pleasure in presenting the Army Distinguished Service Medal to Colonel (Corps of Engineers) Edmund Leo Daley, United States Army, for exceptionally meritorious and distinguished services to the Government of the United States, in a duty of great responsibility during World War I. Colonel Daley served with distinction as Division Engineer of the 3d Division and as Commanding Officer of the 6th Engineers. Due to his energy and resourcefulness, he accomplished arduous tasks with marked success. With remarkable skill he directed the laying out of the defense scheme of the positions taken in the Meuse-Argonne offensive, rendering services of inestimable value to the American Expeditionary Forces."

Service: Army Rank: Colonel Division: American Expeditionary Forces General Orders: War Department, General Orders No. 95 (1919)

=== Slver Star citation ===
"In the Bois de Fays, from Oct. 14 to Oct. 26, 1918, Colonel Daley, under continuous harassing fire during which losses were considerable, by his example of endurance, cheerfulness and high courage, was a constant source of inspiration for both officers and men of his command."

Service: Army Rank: Colonel Division: 3rd Division General Orders: 3rd Division (1919)

== Retirement and death ==
From 1942 to 1945, Daley served as New York State Deputy Director of Civil Defense. From 1945 to 1956, he served as New York State Deputy Director of Veterans Affairs. In retirement, Daley resided at the Fort Orange Club in Albany, New York. Daley died in Albany on December 19, 1968. He was buried at West Point Cemetery.

== Family ==
In 1906, Daley married Beatrix Koehler, the daughter of Colonel Herman Koehler. She died in 1928, and they were the parents of three children: Brigadier General Edmund Koehler Daley Sr. (1907–1955); Lieutenant General John Phillips Daley (1910–1963); and Colonel Donal Martin Daley (1912–1977).
