= Indoor Obstacle Course Test =

Department of Physical Education fitness test

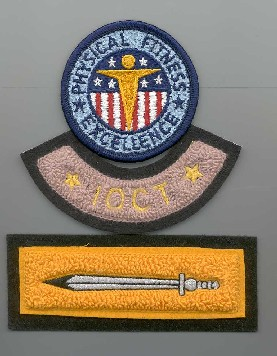
- Dates: Periodically throughout the year; primary test is in February
- Locations: Hayes Gym, USMA
- Inaugurated: 1944

The Indoor Obstacle Course Test (IOCT) is a test of full-body functional physical fitness administered by the Department of Physical Education (DPE) at the United States Military Academy at West Point, New York. DPE considers the IOCT to be one of the best evaluations of total body fitness given in the Army. Cadets who earn an A− (2:38 or less for men and 3:35 or less for women) are authorized to wear the IOCT Badge on their athletic shorts.

== Description ==
DPE administers the test in historic Hayes Gymnasium, built in 1910. The IOCT is similar in concept to the obstacle course seen on the TV show American Gladiators, with the addition of a quarter mile sprint at the conclusion of the course. DPE administers the IOCT to all third, second, and first class cadets through the academic year. Large crowds of cadets, officers, and other onlookers gather to watch.

== Relevance ==
Army Regulation 350-1, Army Training and Leader Development, specifically supports functional fitness and the IOCT by specifically naming numerous skill related components of fitness, like balance, agility, and coordination by stating "Preparation for the APFT is of secondary importance. Maintenance of the military skills listed below will also be emphasized."

The IOCT is often cited or studied in articles concerning high intensity human performance and obstacle courses. This is due to the large amount of available data due to the lengthy history of the course. It has been administered with few changes since 1944.

== Test sequence ==
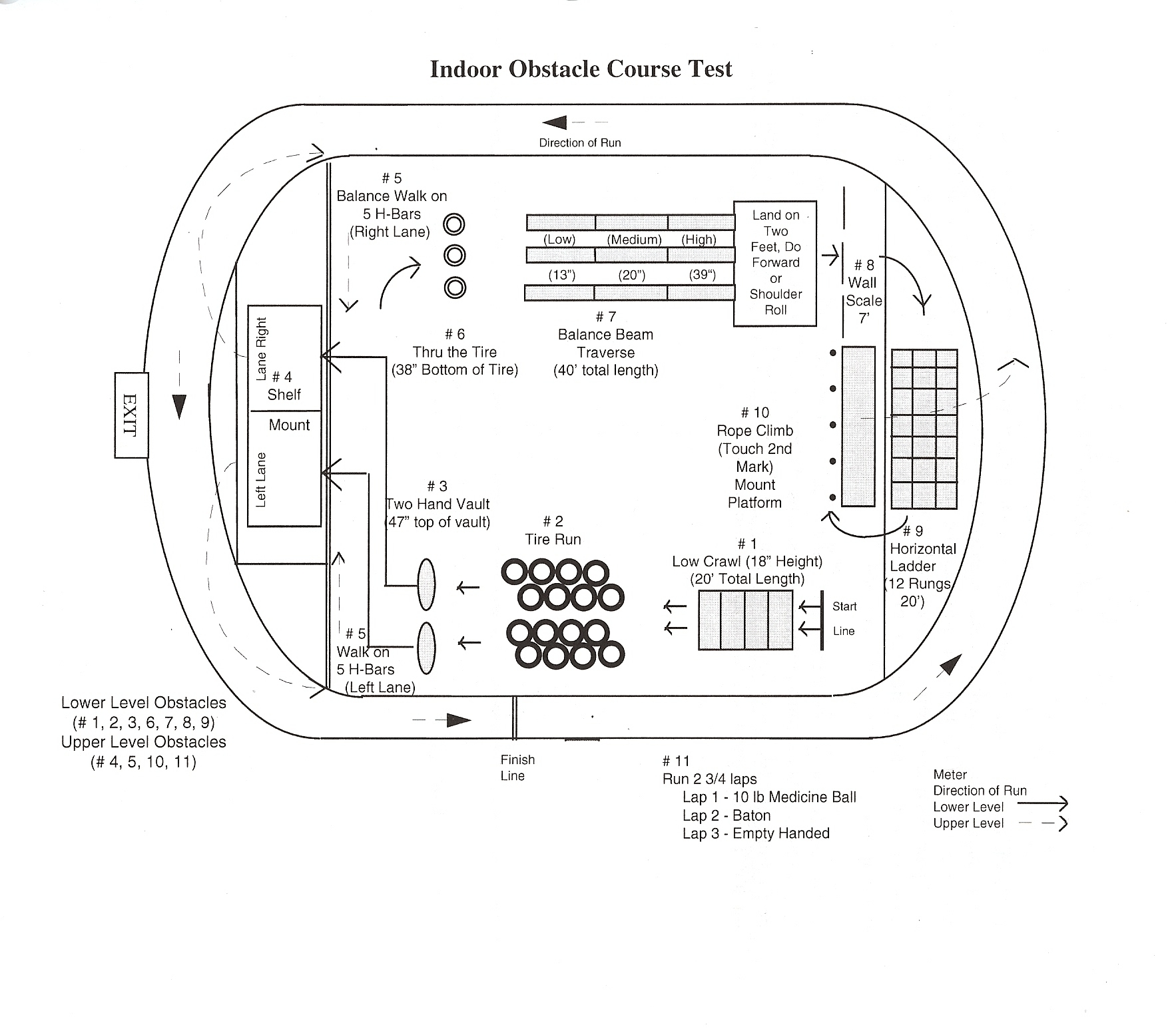
Course diagram

The test consists of 11 events performed sequentially: low crawl under barrier, tire footwork, two-handed vault, 8 ft horizontal shelf, horizontal bar navigation, hanging tire, balance beam, 8 ft vertical wall, 20 ft horizontal ladder, 16 ft vertical rope, and 350 m sprint (carrying a 6 lb medicine ball for the first 120 m, a baton for the second 120 m, and empty-handed for the remaining 110 m). Because of the level of athletic skill needed to pass the test and the level of effort needed to excel at it, the IOCT holds a place in the hearts of all West Point Cadets and graduates. A search of YouTube will return videos about it.. The IOCT is seen as a link between graduates of long ago and cadets of today.

== History ==
DPE began administering the IOCT in 1944 during the Second World War. After lessons learned from WWII, the IOCT was changed to obstacles that are similar to what we see today. The test has changed little since 1948.

- 1944: An Indoor Obstacle Course Test (IOCT) was created to bring about a more comprehensive measurement of cadet physical ability.
- 1948: The IOCT was reexamined and military specific items were replaced by a series of obstacles that measured agility, strength, technique, and cardiovascular ability.
- 1975: The IOCT was altered due to the concern about the potential for injury in the dive roll which started the test. The dive roll was replaced by the low crawl. Additionally, the cargo net used to reach the balcony if the rope or shelf could not be negotiated was replaced by stairs.
- 1979: The IOCT changed slightly again. A ladder replaced the stairs used by cadets unable to negotiate the shelf or rope climb to reach the balcony.
- 1981: The last significant changes were made to the IOCT. The IOCT’s emphasis on upper body strength had consistently been a problem for women since their admission in 1976. To reduce this emphasis and include additional tests of balance and agility the parallel bar walk was eliminated and a tire run and balance beam were added. This resulted in a sharp decline in IOCT failure rates for both men and women.
- 1982: IOCT passing times changed to: Men - 3:19 Women - 6:28
- 1985: IOCT passing times changed to: Men - 3:19 Women - 5:29
- 1986: The cargo net is re-inserted to replace the ladder for those cadets unable to negotiate the shelf or rope climb to reach the balcony. Additionally, automatic IOCT failure for any cadet who must attempt the cargo net and fails to reach balcony e.g., cargo net failure.
- 1989: Fourth Class IOCT grade was incorporated into their Fourth Class Gymnastics subcourse grade. Only those cadets who scored a C− or lower on their Third Class IOCT had to take the IOCT again during their Second Class year.
- 2002: All second class cadets are required to take the IOCT. It is incorporated into the Fourth Class Gymnastics course, but the second class takes the test at some point during the year. Upper classmen's times are incorporated into their overall physical grade. An upperclassman failing the IOCT is subject to some form of punishment or restriction until such time as he can pass the test.
- 2014: All cadets are required to take the IOCT every academic year. It is incorporated into the Fourth Class Gymnastics course, but the first, second and third classes take the test at some point during the year.

== Gender difference ==
The difference in completion time grade scales between male and female cadets is taken into account during the order of merit listing that the United States Military Academy uses for branch and post selections for cadets. From the USMA White Book: "To further encourage cadets to engage the IOCT at the highest level of performance, anyone may retest the IOCT for grade replacement. Cadets are permitted to retake the IOCT (regardless of their current score) during designated spring term IOCT dates. Only the highest grade earned during each academic year will be used to compute the Physical Program Score Cumulative (PPSC)."

== Grade scale ==
	Men	Women
A+	2:26 or Less	3:14 or Less
A	2:27-2:33	3:15-3:25
A-	2:34-2:38	3:26-3:35
B+	2:39-2:41	3:36-3:47
B	2:42-2:44	3:48-4:01
B-	2:45-2:49	4:04-4:06
C+	2:50-2:54	4:07-4:24
C	2:55-3:01	4:25-4:54
C-	3:02-3:13	4:55-5:17
D	3:14-3:30	5:18-5:29
F	3:31+	5:30+

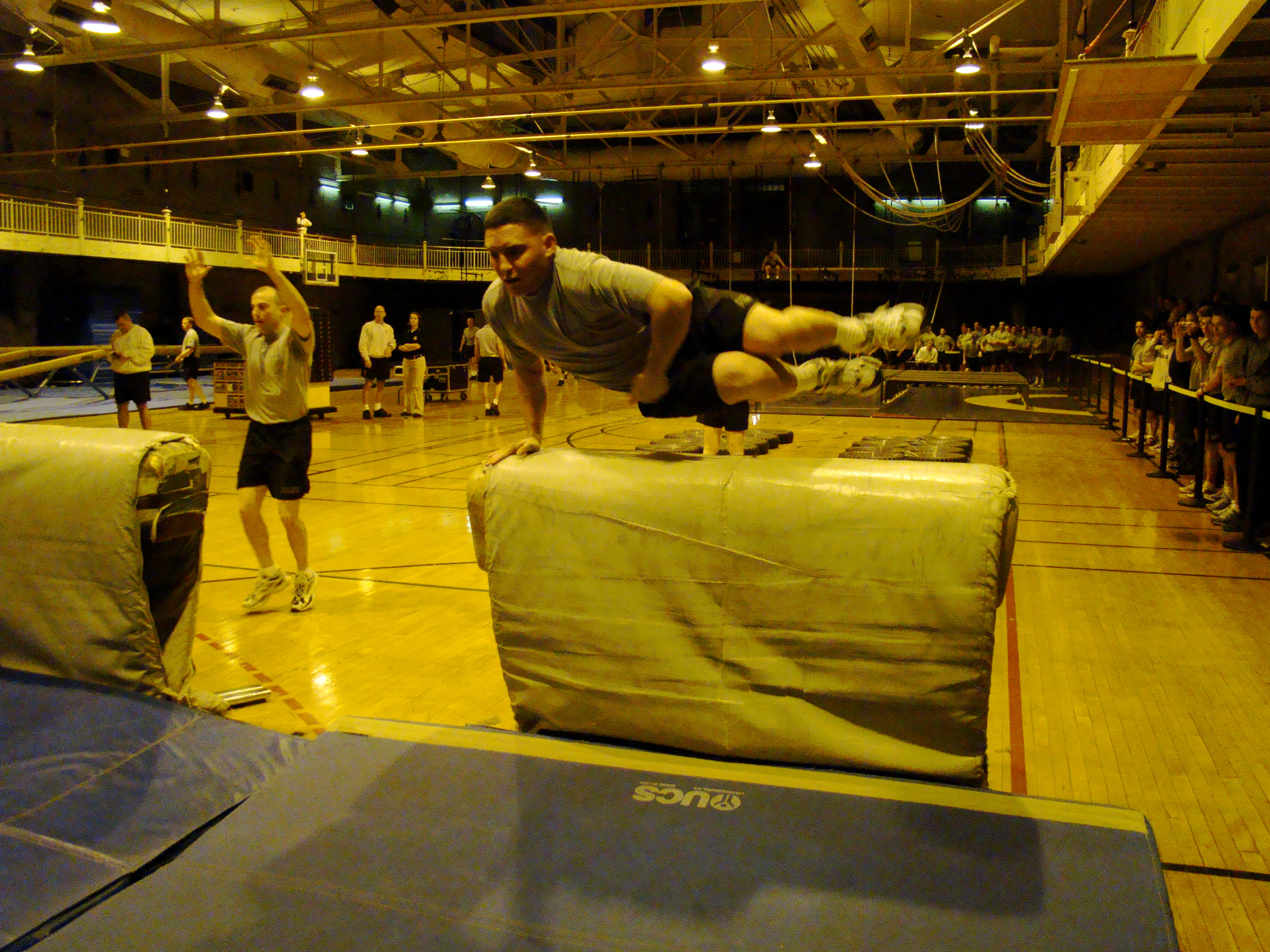
Vault

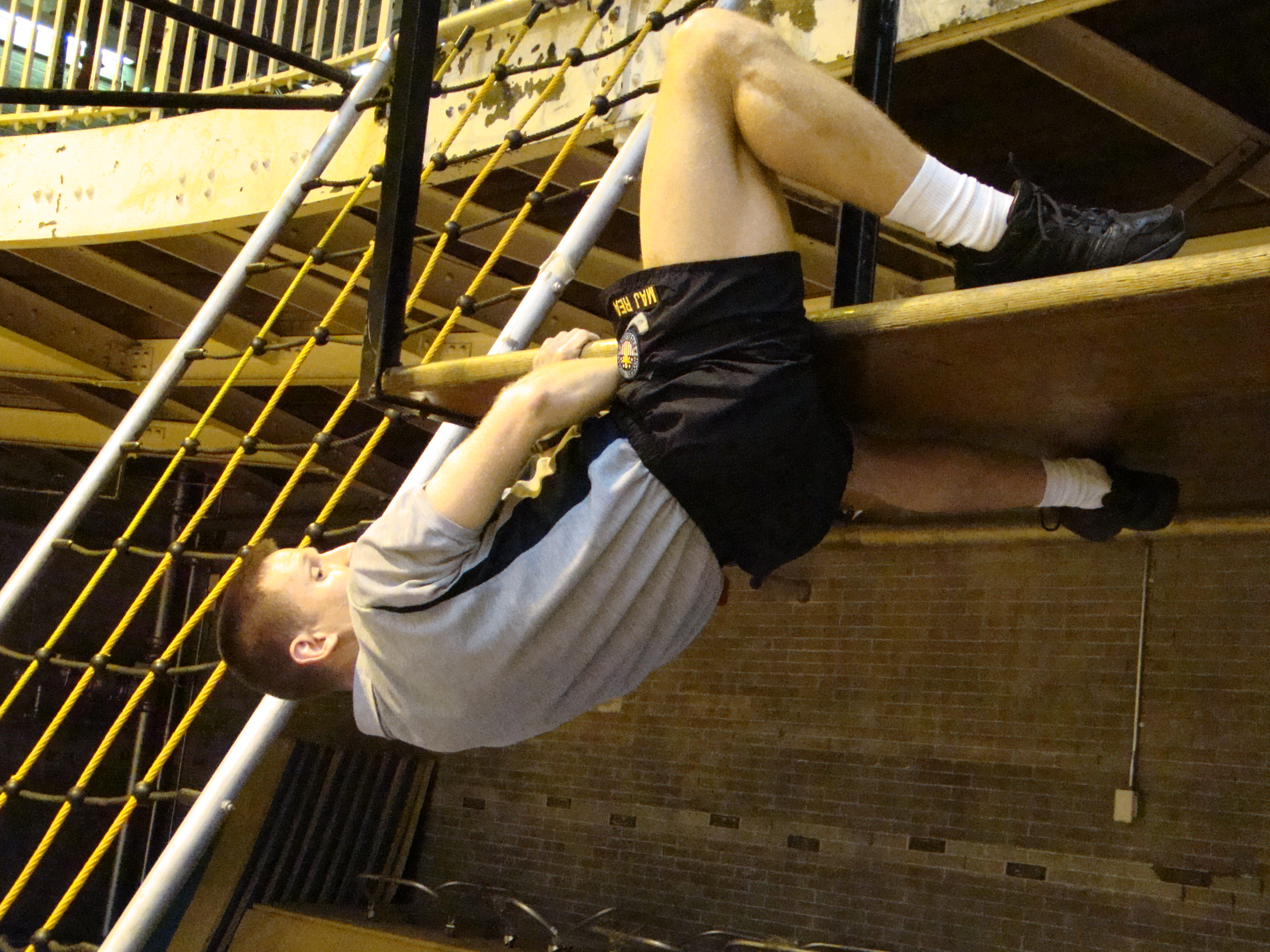
Shelf

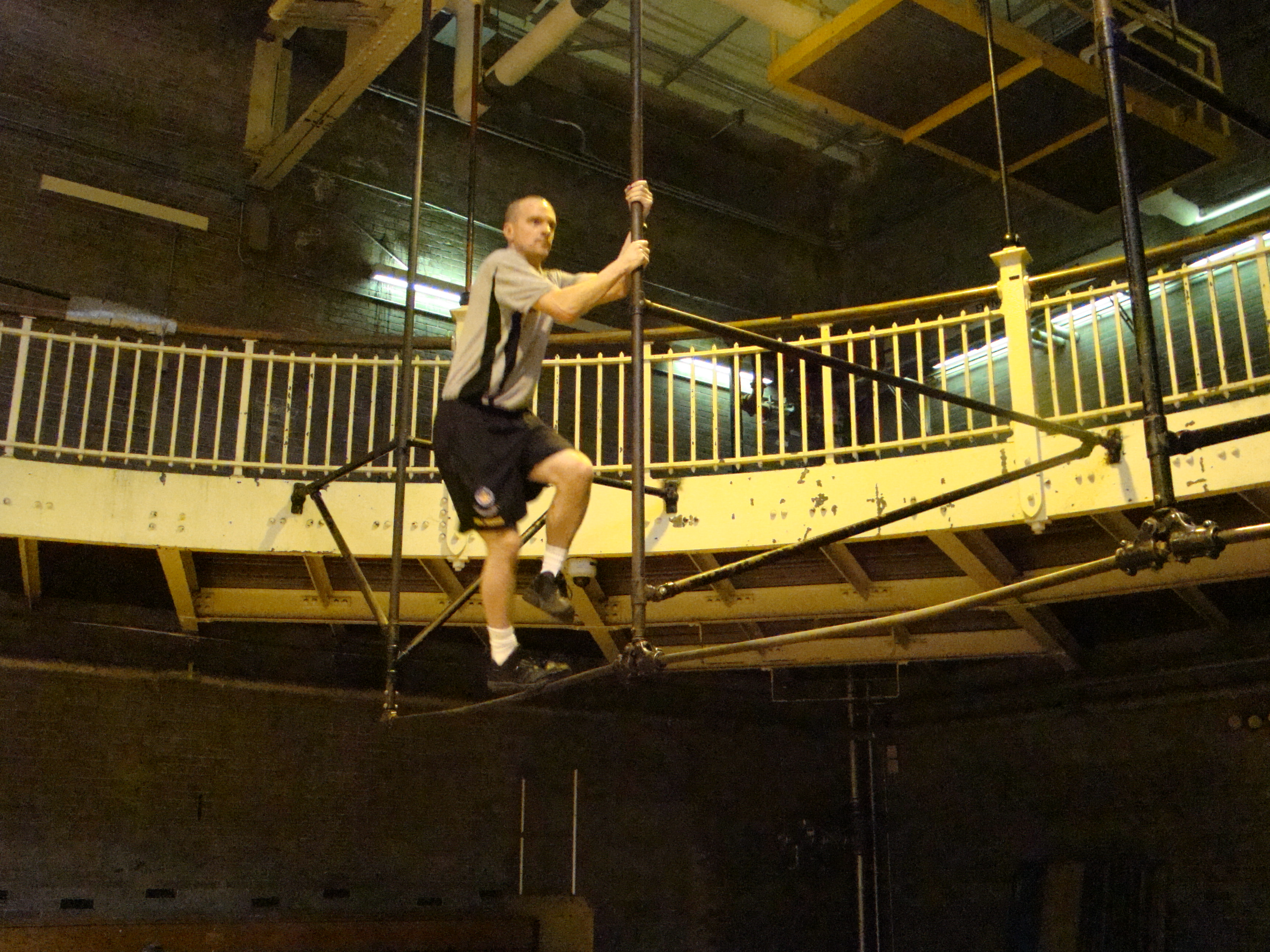
Horizontal bars

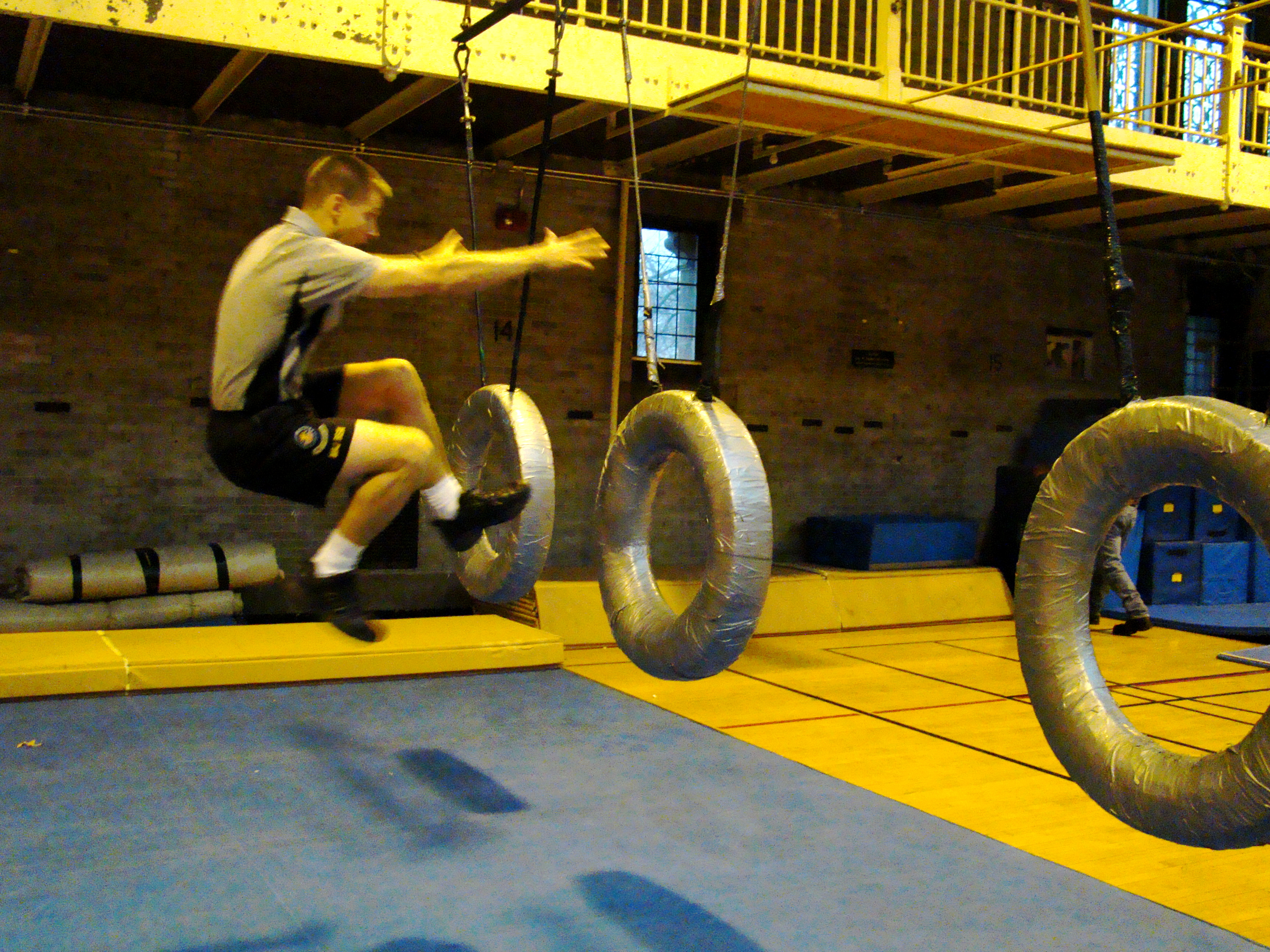
Hanging tire

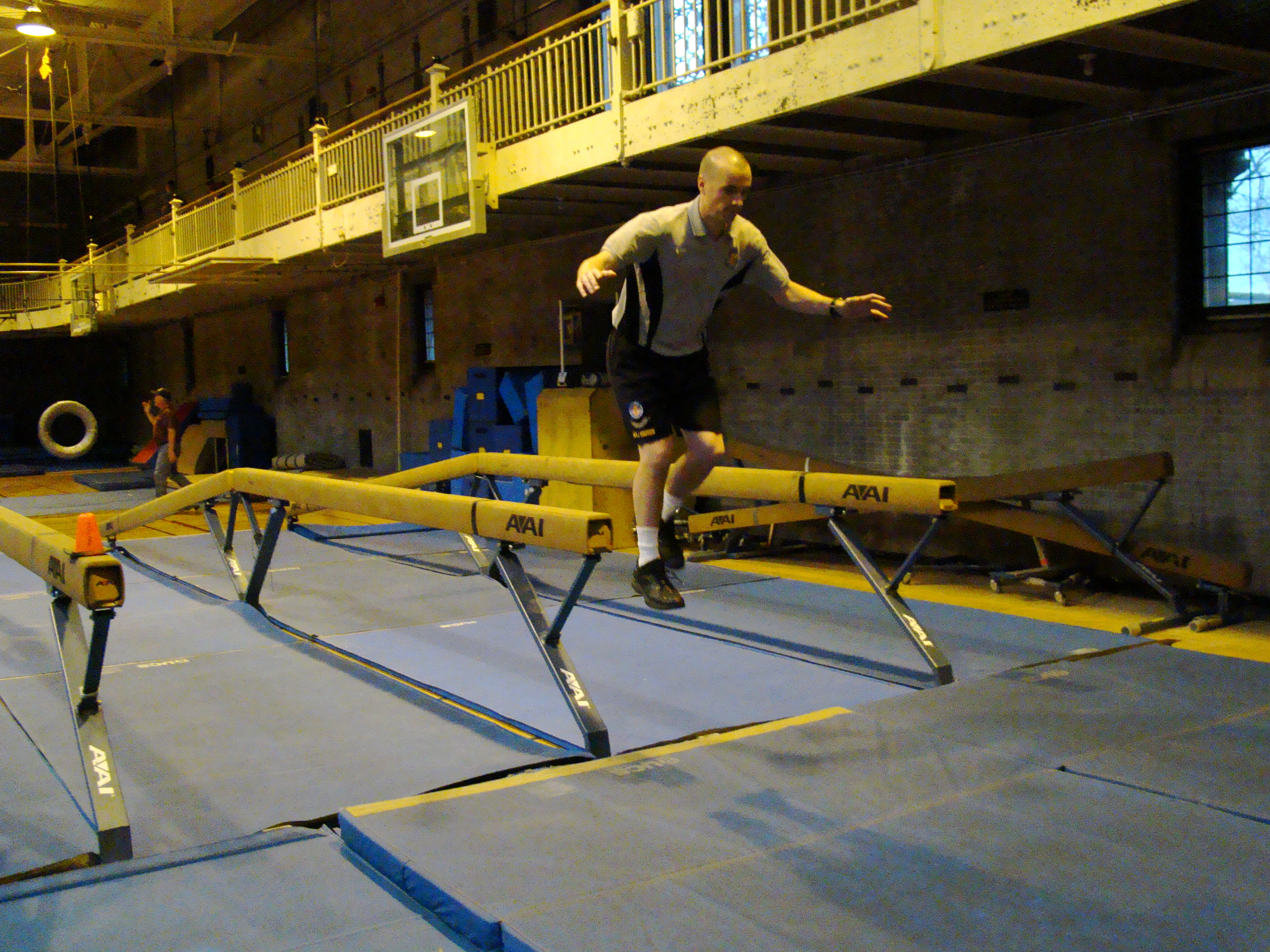
Balance beam dismount

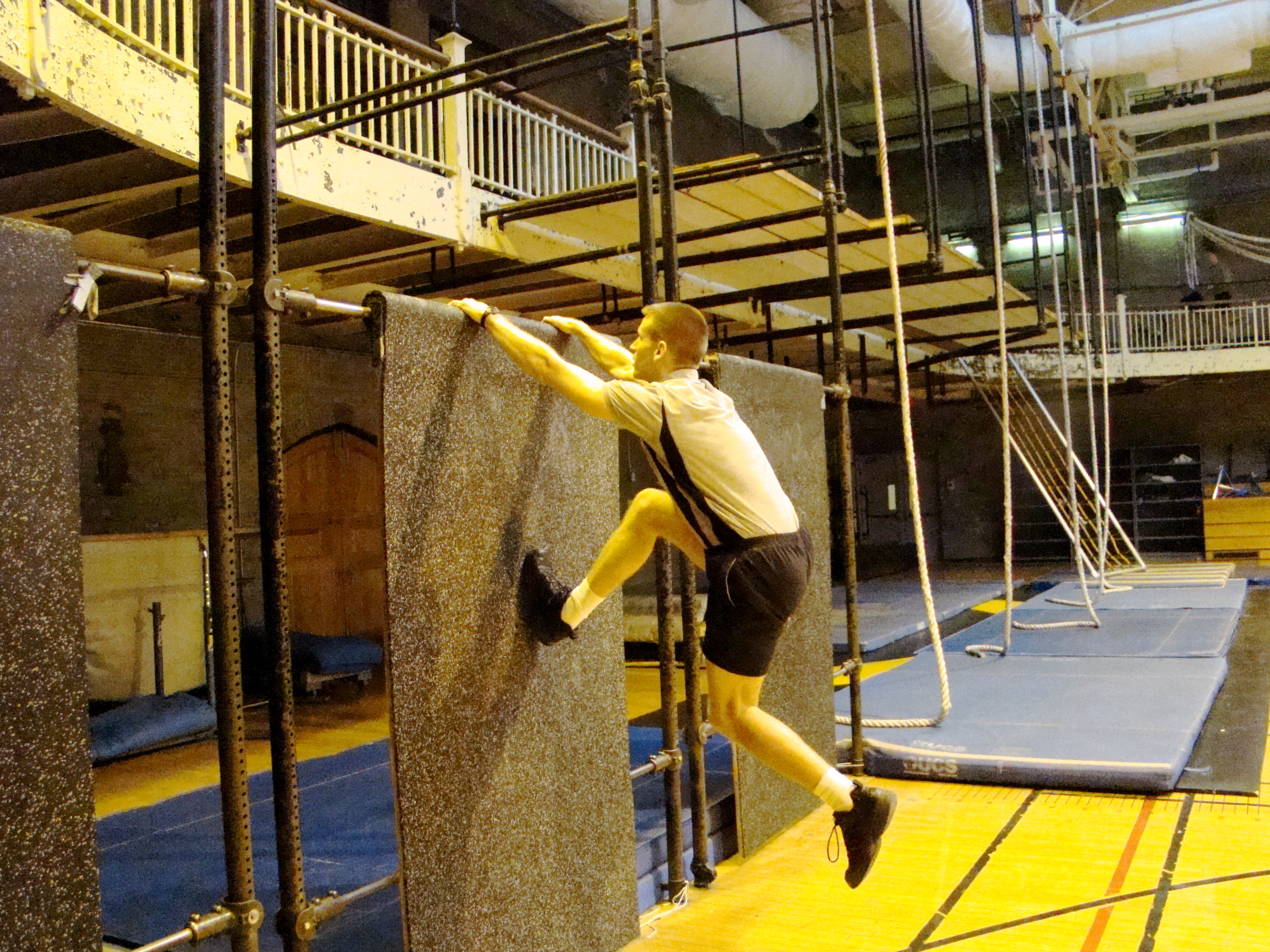
Horizontal wall

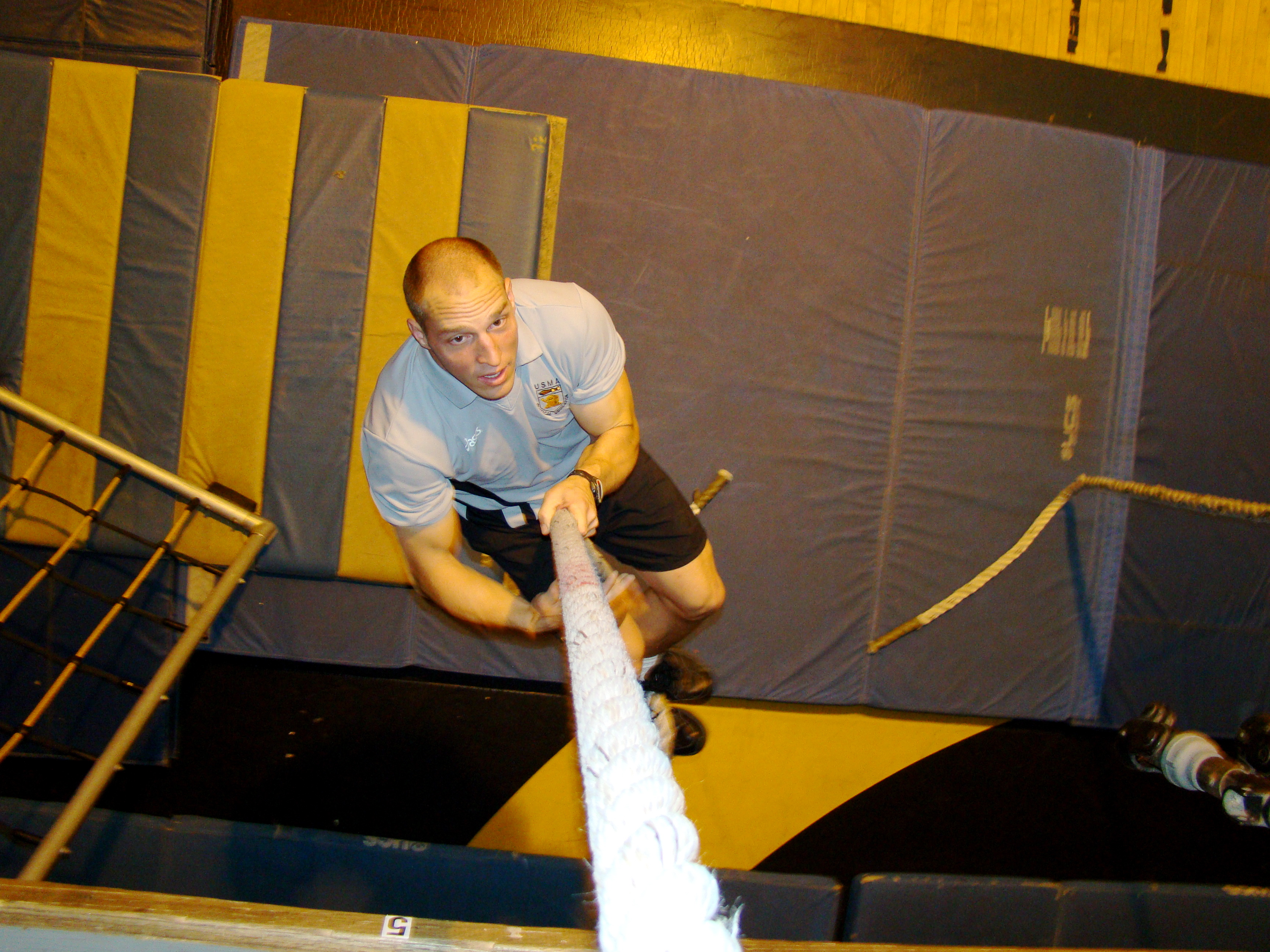
Vertical rope
