= Millard's Preparatory School =

Former Washington D.C. military preparatory school

Millard's Preparatory School, also known as the Millard Preparatory School for West Point, was a military preparatory school in Washington, D.C. that existed from 1925 to 1948. It was founded by Homer Millard. The school prepared students whose regular secondary school education and training was insufficient for entry into United States Military Academy.

The school was later re-founded in 1953 as the Millard School in Oregon.

== Notable alumni ==
- John P. Daley, 1927, U.S. Army lieutenant general
- Robin Olds, 1940, fighter pilot and general officer in the United States Air Force
