= John P. Daley (U.S. Army general) =

U.S. Army lieutenant general

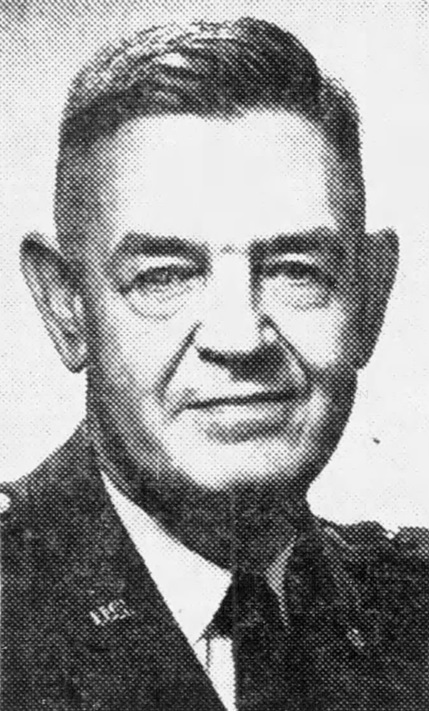
- El Paso Herald-Post, July 10, 1962
- Born: July 17, 1910; Washington, D.C., U.S.
- Died: July 21, 1963 (aged 53); Albany, New York, U.S.
- Burial place: West Point Cemetery
- Education: United States Military Academy; United States Army Command and General Staff College; National War College; United States Army War College
- Spouse: Katherine Hadley White (m. 1932–1963)
- Children: 2
- Relatives: Edmund L. Daley (father); Herman Koehler (grandfather)
- Military career
- Service: United States Army
- Service years: 1931–1963
- Rank: Lieutenant General
- Nickname: Jack
- Service number: 018358
- Unit: U.S. Army Field Artillery Branch
- Commands: 362nd Field Artillery Battalion; Director, Survey Officer Course, U.S. Army Field Artillery School; 2nd Infantry Division Artillery; III Armored Corps Artillery; Director of Special Weapons, U.S. Army Research and Development Office; Southern European Task Force; U.S. Army Combat Developments Command
- Wars: World War II; Korean War
- Awards: Army Distinguished Service Medal; Legion of Merit (with two oak leaf clusters); Order of Merit of the Italian Republic

John Phillips Daley (July 17, 1910 – July 21, 1963) was a career officer in the United States Army. The son and grandson of prominent army officers, he served from 1931 until his death and attained the rank of lieutenant general. A veteran of World War II and the Korean War, his senior assignments included commanding general of the U.S. Army Combat Developments Command, and his awards included the Army Distinguished Service Medal and three awards of the Legion of Merit.

A native of Washington, D.C., Daley was raised at several locations in the United States as his father carried out assignments with the U.S. Army Corps of Engineers. Daley graduated from Pittsburgh's Peabody High School in 1926. He studied at George Washington University for a year while also attending Millard's Preparatory School. In 1927, he received an at-large appointment to the United States Military Academy at West Point. He graduated in 1931 ranked 24th of 296, and was appointed a second lieutenant of Field Artillery.

At the start of his career, Daley carried out Field Artillery and Civilian Conservation Corps postings at locations including Fort Sam Houston, Texas, Fort Douglas, Utah, and CCC sites in Wyoming and Oregon. Beginning in 1937, Daley served on the West Point faculty as an instructor of Physics. During World War II, he commanded a Field Artillery battalion, served as an instructor at the Field Artillery School, and carried out senior Field Artillery staff officer positions in Europe. After the war, he attended the United States Army Command and General Staff College and the National War College, served again on the West Point faculty, and served on the faculty of the United States Army War College.

During the Korean War, Daley was executive officer of I Corps Artillery and commander of 2nd Infantry Division Artillery. After the war, his postings included chief of staff for United Nations Command Military Armistice Commission, commander of III Armored Corps Artillery, and director of special weapons research in the office of the army's chief of research and development. His senior assignments included commander of the Southern European Task Force in Italy, deputy chief of staff and deputy army commander for reserve affairs at United States Army Europe. In the early 1960s, he was assigned as deputy commander of the Continental Army Command.

In 1962, the army created the Combat Developments Command, and Daley was named its first commander. He was still assigned as CDC commander when he was stricken with a fatal heart attack on July 21, 1963 while in Albany, New York to visit his father. Daley was buried at West Point Cemetery.

== Early life ==
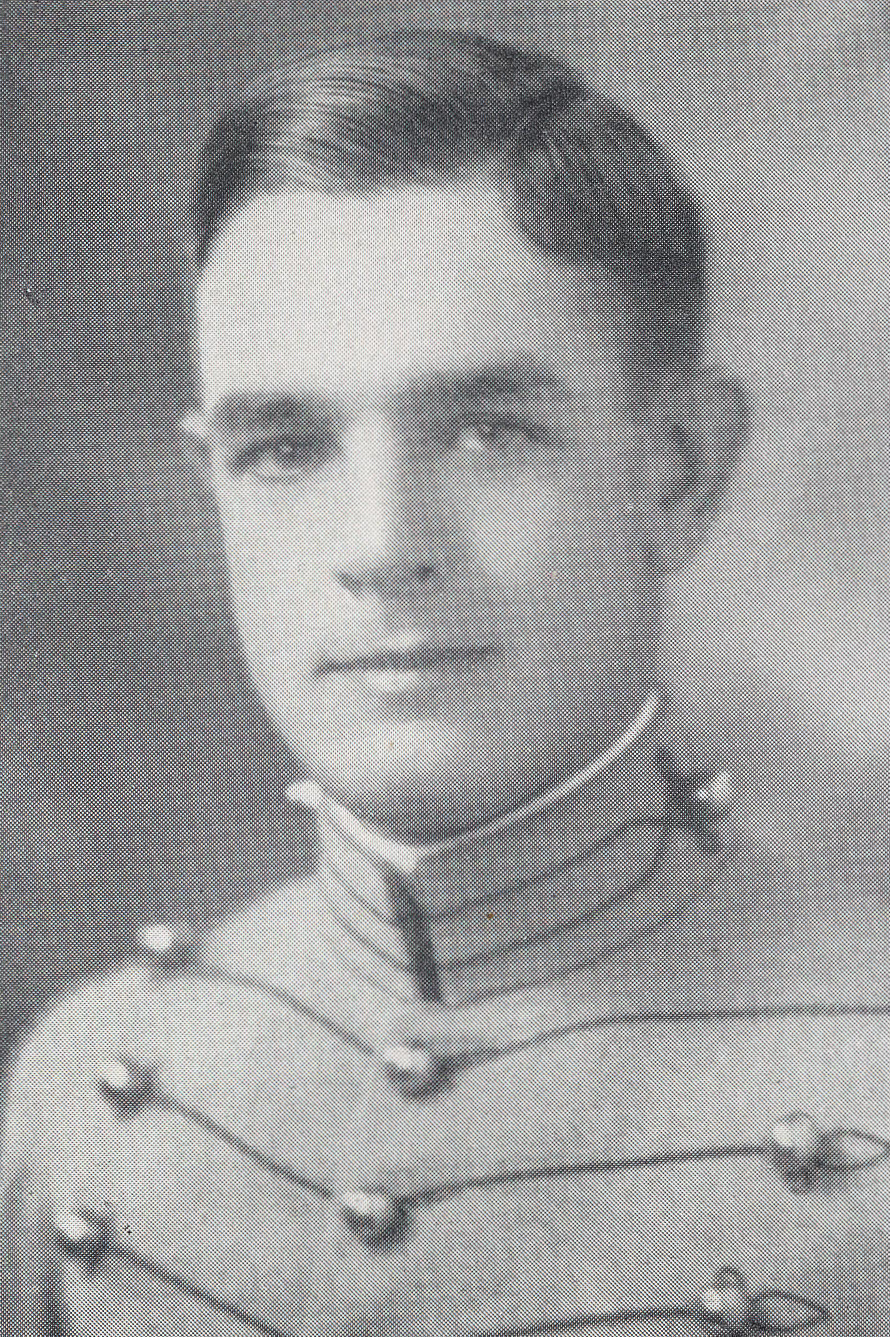
Daley as a United States Military Academy cadet c. 1931

John Phillips Daley was born in Washington, D.C. on July 17, 1910, a son of Major General Edmund L. Daley and Beatrix Otillie (Koehler) Daley. His mother was the daughter of Colonel Herman Koehler. Daley was raised at several army posts during his father's career with the U.S. Army Corps of Engineers, and in 1926 he graduated from Peabody High School in Pittsburgh.

After high school, Daley spent a year studying at George Washington University while simultaneously attending Millard's Preparatory School, a Washington, D.C. institution that trained students to attend the United States Military Academy at West Point. In 1927, he obtained an at-large appointment to West Point. He attended from 1927 to 1931, and graduated ranked 24th in his class of 296. Among his classmates who became general officers was Charles H. Bonesteel III. He was commissioned as a second lieutenant of Field Artillery.

== Start of career ==
After receiving his commission, Daley attended United States Army Air Corps flight training at Randolph Field, Texas from September 1931 to February 1938. After being relieved from attachment to the Air Corps, he was assigned to the 12th Field Artillery Regiment at Fort Sam Houston until May 30, 1933. He was then detailed to duty with the Civilian Conservation Corps, first at Fort Douglas, Utah, then in Wyoming, and later in Oregon. In November 1933, he returned to duty with the 12th Field Artillery, where he remained until December, when he was assigned to duty with the Civil Works Administration at Fort Sam Houston. He served with the 12th Artillery again from May to October 1934, when he was posted to Fort Sill, Oklahoma so he could attend the Field Artillery School Regular Course.

From October 1934 to June 1935, Daley was assigned to duty with 2nd Battalion, 76th Field Artillery Regiment at the Presidio of Monterey, California. In July 1937, he was assigned to the West Point faculty as an instructor in the Department of Physics. Daley was promoted to first lieutenant in August 1935. He remained on the faculty until June 1942, and with the army expanding for U.S. entry into World War II, he received temporary promotion to captain in September 1940. Daley was promoted to permanent captain in June 1941 and temporary major in February 1942.

== Continued career ==
Daley commanded the 362nd Field Artillery Battalion from July 1942 to January 1943, first at Fort Still, and later at Camp Adair, Oregon. He was promoted to temporary lieutenant colonel in September 1942. In January 1943, he was appointed to the faculty at the Field Artillery School, first in the Gunnery Department, and from July 1943 to January 1944 as director of the Survey Officer Course.

In February 1944, Daley deployed to the European theater, where he joined the staff of the Field Artillery section at the Twelfth United States Army Group headquarters. He remained with this headquarters until July 1945, and was promoted to temporary colonel in December 1944. While in Europe, Daley took part in the Normandy campaign, Northern France campaign, Ardennes campaign, Rhineland campaign, and Central European campaign.

After the end of combat in Europe, Daley served as assistant artillery officer on the staff of the XXIII Corps from July to September 1945, and on the staff of Fifteenth Army from September 1945 to January 1946. From February to June 1946, he was a student at the United States Army Command and General Staff College. He then rejoined the West Point faculty, this time as associate professor of Physics and Chemistry. In June 1947, his temporary colonel's rank was terminated.

From August 1947 to June 1948, Daley was a student at the National War College. After graduating, he was assigned to the International Branch of the Army General Staff. In April 1950 he was assigned to the faculty of the United States Army War College, and assisted in moving the school from Fort Leavenworth, Kansas to Carlisle Barracks, Pennsylvania. Daley was then enrolled as an Army War College student, and he completed the course in 1951.

== Later career ==
In 1952, Daley was ordered to Korean War duty as executive officer of I Corps Artillery, followed by assignment as commander of 2nd Infantry Division Artillery. He took part in several campaigns, including UN Summer-Fall Offensive (1952); Third Korean Winter (1952–1953); and Korean Summer (1953). He was promoted to brigadier general in March 1953. From June 1953 to March 1954, Daley was chief of staff for the United Nations Command Military Armistice Commission, then served as a member of the commission. During these postings, he took part in post-war negotiations on topics including prisoner of war exchanges, the release of Chinese prisoners, and patrolling of the Korean Demilitarized Zone.

Daley was posted to Fort Hood, Texas as commander of III Armored Corps Artillery in March 1954. He led this command until March 1955, when he was appointed Director of Special Weapons in the U.S. Army Research and Development Office. In this assignment, he was responsible for research into antiaircraft artillery, guided missiles, rockets and satellites, and atomic weapons. He served as director until October 1958, and was promoted to major general in July 1956.

In October 1958, Daley was assigned to Italy as commander of the Southern European Task Force. In this assignment, he was responsible for missile support to the North Atlantic Treaty Organization's Allied Land Forces Southern Europe, and he served in Italy until late 1960. He was then posted to West Germany as deputy chief of staff for United States Army Europe, which was followed by assignment as USAREUR's deputy area commander for Reserve Affairs. In mid-1961, Daley was assigned as deputy commander of U.S. Continental Army Command. In the spring of 1962, he was appointed as the first commander of U.S. Army Combat Developments Command and promoted to lieutenant general.

Daley was still serving as CDC commander when he was stricken with a fatal heart attack while visiting his father in Albany, New York on July 21, 1963. Daley was buried at West Point Cemetery.

== Awards ==
Daley's awards included the Army Distinguished Service Medal and three awards of the Legion of Merit. His foreign awards included the Order of Merit of the Italian Republic.

=== Army Distinguished Service Medal citation ===
The President of the United States of America, authorized by Act of Congress July 9, 1918, had the honor of presenting the Army Distinguished Service Medal (Posthumously) to Lieutenant General John Phillips Daley (ASN: 0-18358), United States Army, for exceptionally meritorious and distinguished service in a position of great responsibility to the Government of the United States, during the period April 1954 to July 1963. Through his dedicated devotion to duty, purposeful pursuit of national interests, and unique talents in presenting a clear view of the Army's capability to cope with worldwide conditions, he materially strengthened the United States' effort toward world peace and earned the high regard of all associated with him.

General Orders: Department of the Army, General Orders No. 43 (September 27, 1963)

== Family ==
In 1932, Daley married Katherine Hadley White. They remained married until his death and were the parents of two children. Katherine Anne was the wife of first Arthur G. Trudeau Jr. (son of Arthur Trudeau), and was later married to later David D. C. Cramer, then Kenneth Edmund Wattman. John Michael Daley, known as Michael, graduated from West Point in 1958, and later pursued academic and business careers.

Daley's brother Edmund Koehler Daley was an army officer who attained the rank of brigadier general. His brother Donal also served in the army and he attained the rank of colonel.
