= Department of Physical Education =

United States Military Academy department

Department of Physical Education (DPE)
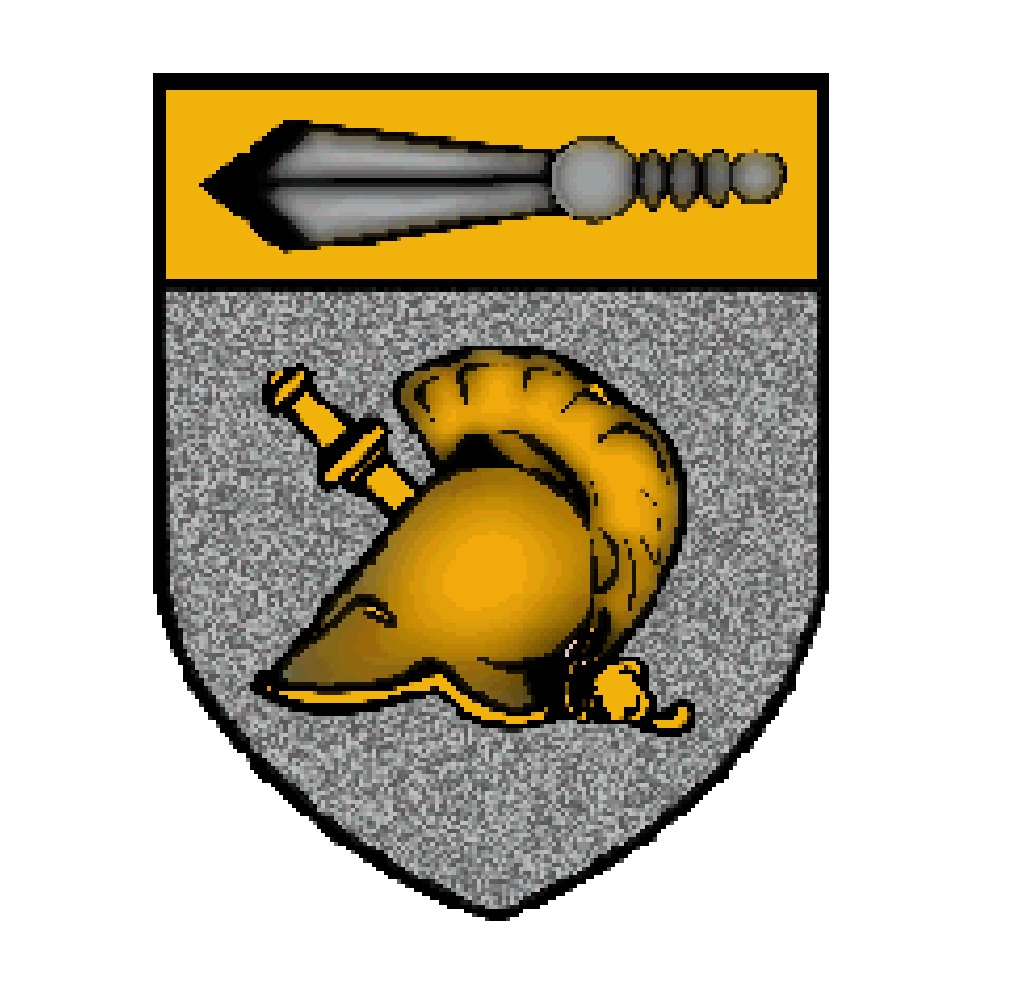
- Other name: "The Department with a Heart"
- Type: Physical Education Department
- Established: 1948
- Department Head: COL Nicholas Gist
- Administrative staff: 49 Instructors & Professors
- Location: West Point, New York
- Website: www.usma.edu/dpe

The Department of Physical Education (also known by its initials DPE) is the academic department that oversees the physical development program at the United States Military Academy at West Point, New York. DPE is headquartered in the Arvin Cadet Physical Development Center. DPE has 24 Military faculty and 25 civilian instructors and professors. The head of the department holds the ceremonial title of Master of the Sword, known within the department as the MOS. This title dates back to when the Cadets at West Point were taught swordsmanship as part of their military and physical training. The current Master of the Sword is COL Nicholas Gist, who has held the position since 2015. The department's stated mission is:

The Department of Physical Education develops warrior leaders of character who are physically and mentally tough by engaging cadets in activities that promote and enhance a healthy lifestyle, physical fitness, movement behavior, and psychomotor performance.

== Duties of instructors ==
Instructors and professors in DPE have a wide range of duties and responsibilities. In addition to evaluating one of the core physical program courses, instructors teach an elective lifetime sport and/or a cognitive exercise science or applied fitness course. Instructors also serve on additional committees such as the Competitive Sports, Testing, & Assessment committees, or may work with the department's operations & plans, or personnel sections.

== Academic courses ==
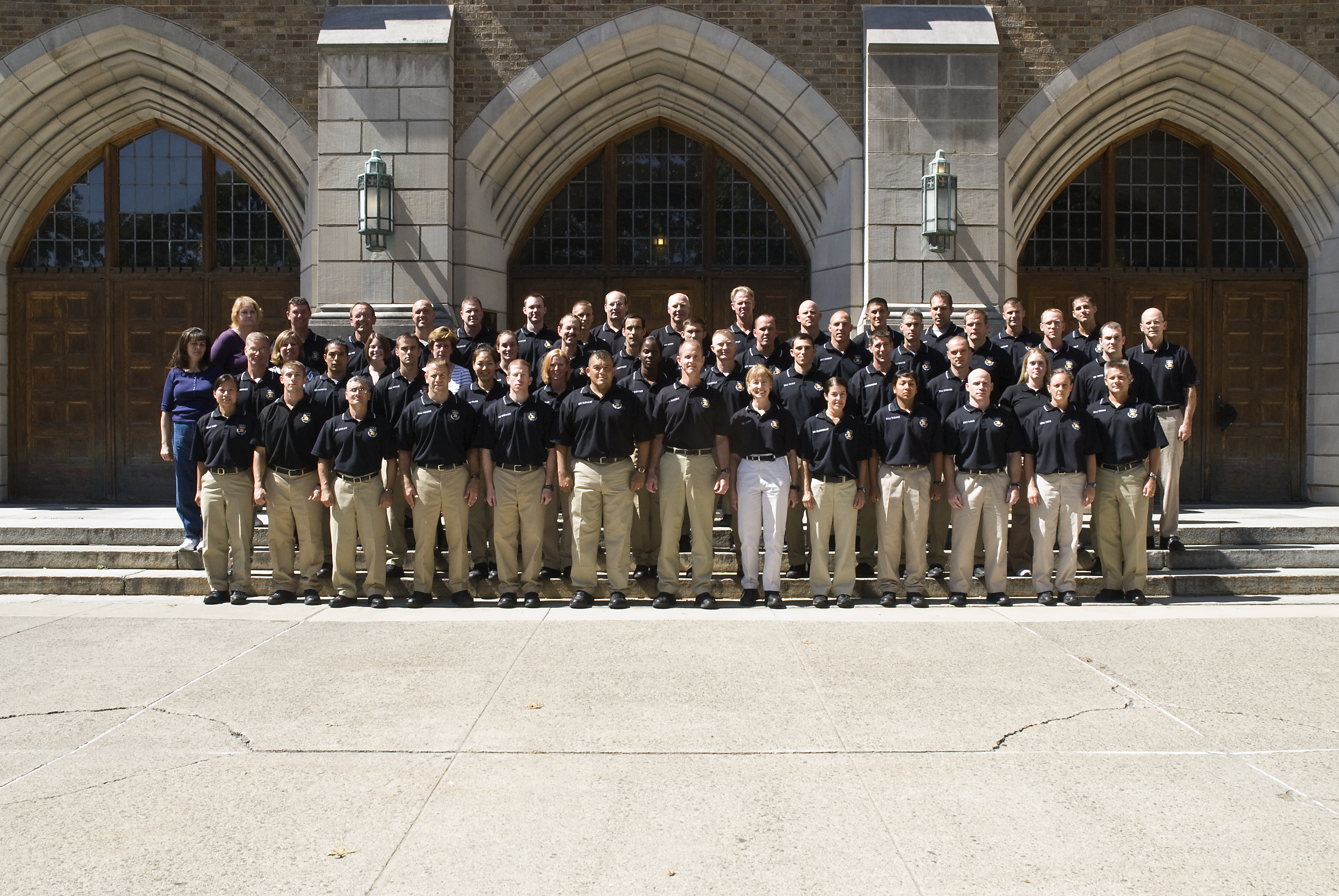
DPE Faculty AY08-09

DPE is responsible for teaching several core courses. To meet this requirement, the department is organized into four "committees". All 49 instructors are a member of one of the four committees. The current DPE committees are:

Committee	Course	Class Year
Military Movement	PE117 – Military Movement	Third Class (Yearlings)
Boxing	PE116 – Boxing	Fourth Class (Plebes)
Swimming	PE109, 320-323 – Swimming	Fourth & Third Class (Plebes & Yearlings)
Combatives	PE360 – Combat Applications	Second Class (Cows)

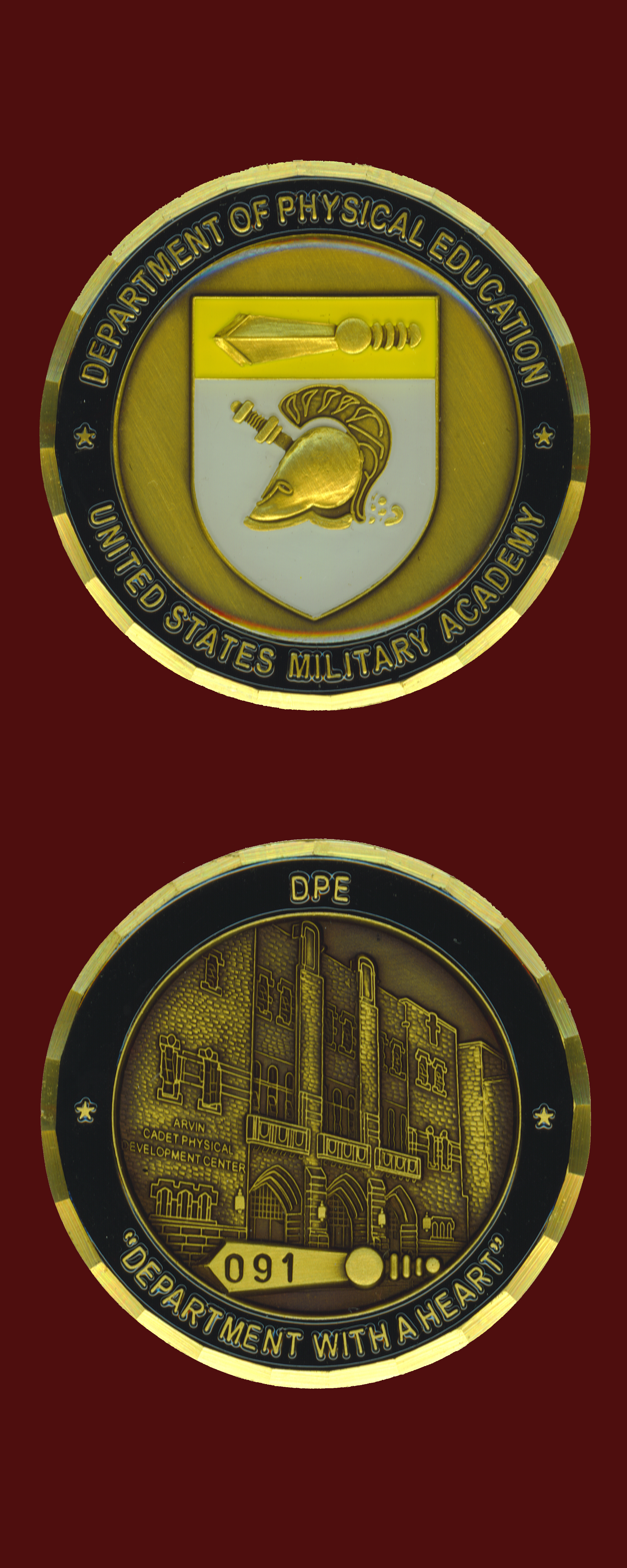
DPE Coin

=== Kinesiology major ===
In 2006, the USMA Academic Board approved DPE to begin offering an academic major for USMA Cadets. The Kinesiology major is taught by professors from DPE's Human Performance Laboratory in conjunction with the Department of Chemistry and Life Sciences. The first cohort of USMA cadets to declare as Kinesiology majors was the class of 2010. Demand for the major is strong and applicants must pass a screening board to be admitted to the program.

=== Other activity courses ===
DPE offers a wide range of elective athletic instructional courses, known to the department as "lifetime physical activities" (LPA), that are taken as electives by the upper class cadets, primarily 3rd (Yearling) and 1st Class (Firstie) Cadets. Because of the strong seasonal changes at West Point, many courses are only offered at certain times of the year. Additionally, team sports that are strongly associated with a certain time of the year (i.e.: Basketball in the winter/spring) are taught at those corresponding times. Current DPE elective courses include: advanced close quarters combat (with striking weapons), advanced grappling (with ground striking), aerobic fitness, basketball, cycling (road & mountain), lifeguard training, golf, ice skating, judo, badminton, racquetball, rock climbing, scuba diving, skiing (x-country & downhill), snowboarding, soccer, strength development, tennis, & volleyball.

=== Cognitive courses ===
In lieu of teaching the course formerly called Master Fitness Trainer by the Army, DPE now teaches two separate lifetime fitness courses to Cadets. The Yearlings (Sophomores) receive PE215, The Fundamentals of Physical Fitness. This course is a 19 lesson course in the basics of health and wellness. Cadets learn basic exercise physiology such as the differences in skeletal muscle fiber types, the effects of low and high-intensity training, nutrition, and healthy lifestyle choices. The course is very much geared towards teaching an individual how to achieve personal lifelong fitness. All Firsties (Seniors) take PE450, Army Fitness Development, which is also 19 lessons. This course briefly reviews the physiology principles taught in PE215 and then applies them to training small units such as squads and platoons. The course is more focused on planning and assessing fitness goals at the small unit level.

== Testing ==
DPE is responsible for administering the Indoor Obstacle Course Test (IOCT). This fitness test is mandatory for all Cadets and must be passed in order to graduate from the academy.

=== IOCT ===
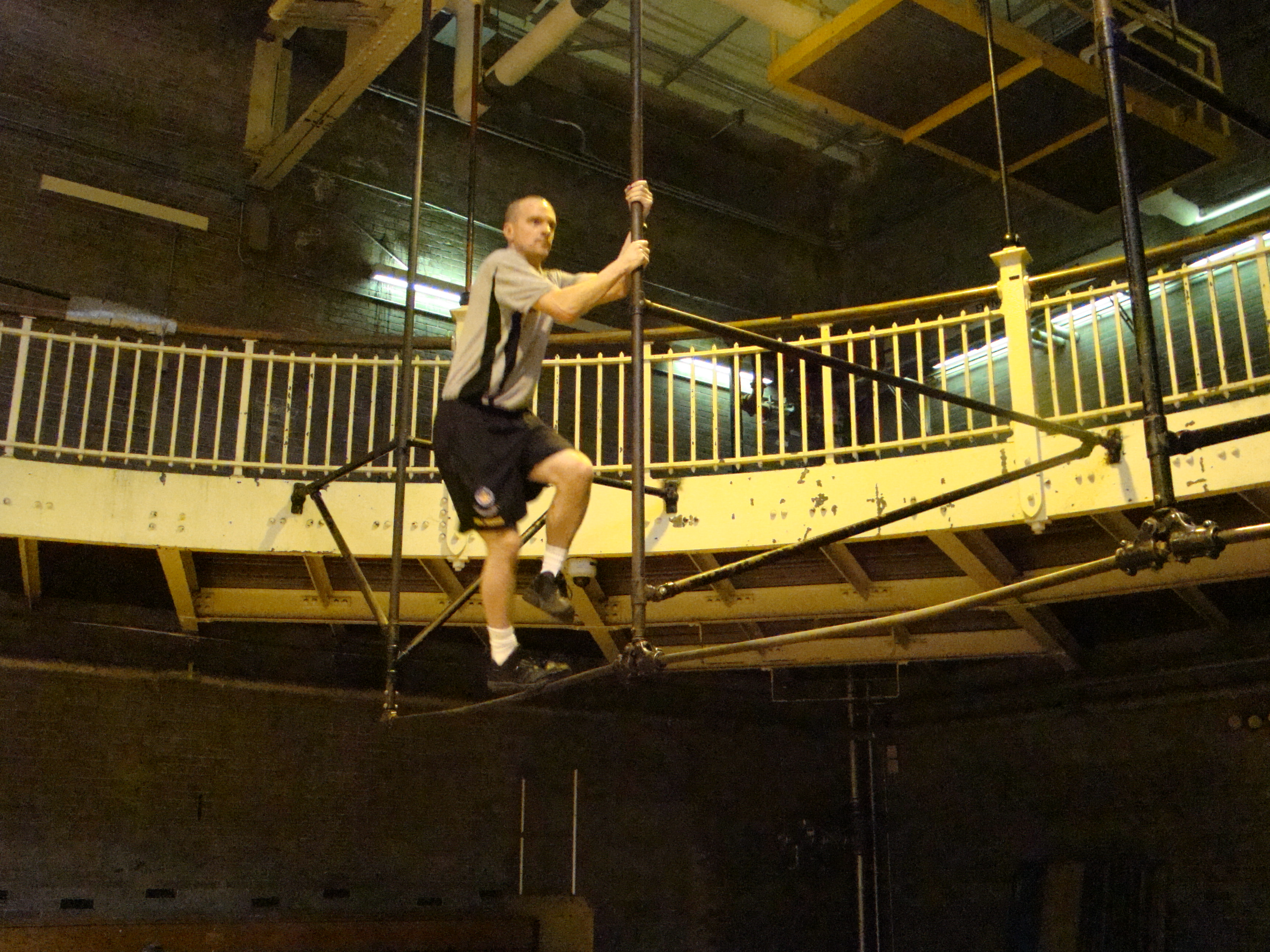
Instructor Demonstrates The Elevated Horizontal Bars

The IOCT is a test of all-around functional physical fitness administered by DPE in the historic Hayes Gymnasium. Hayes Gym, built in 1910, is the oldest part of the newly renovated Arvin Cadet Physical Development Center. Many current and past graduates and faculty consider the IOCT to be one of the best evaluations of total body fitness given in the Army. Cadets who earn an A− (2:38 or less for Males and 3:11 or less for Females) are authorized to wear the IOCT Badge on their athletic shorts.

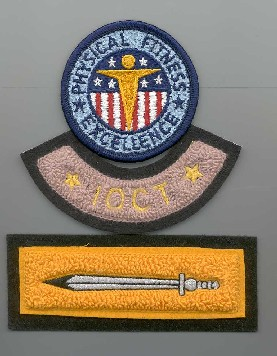
IOCT Badge in Center

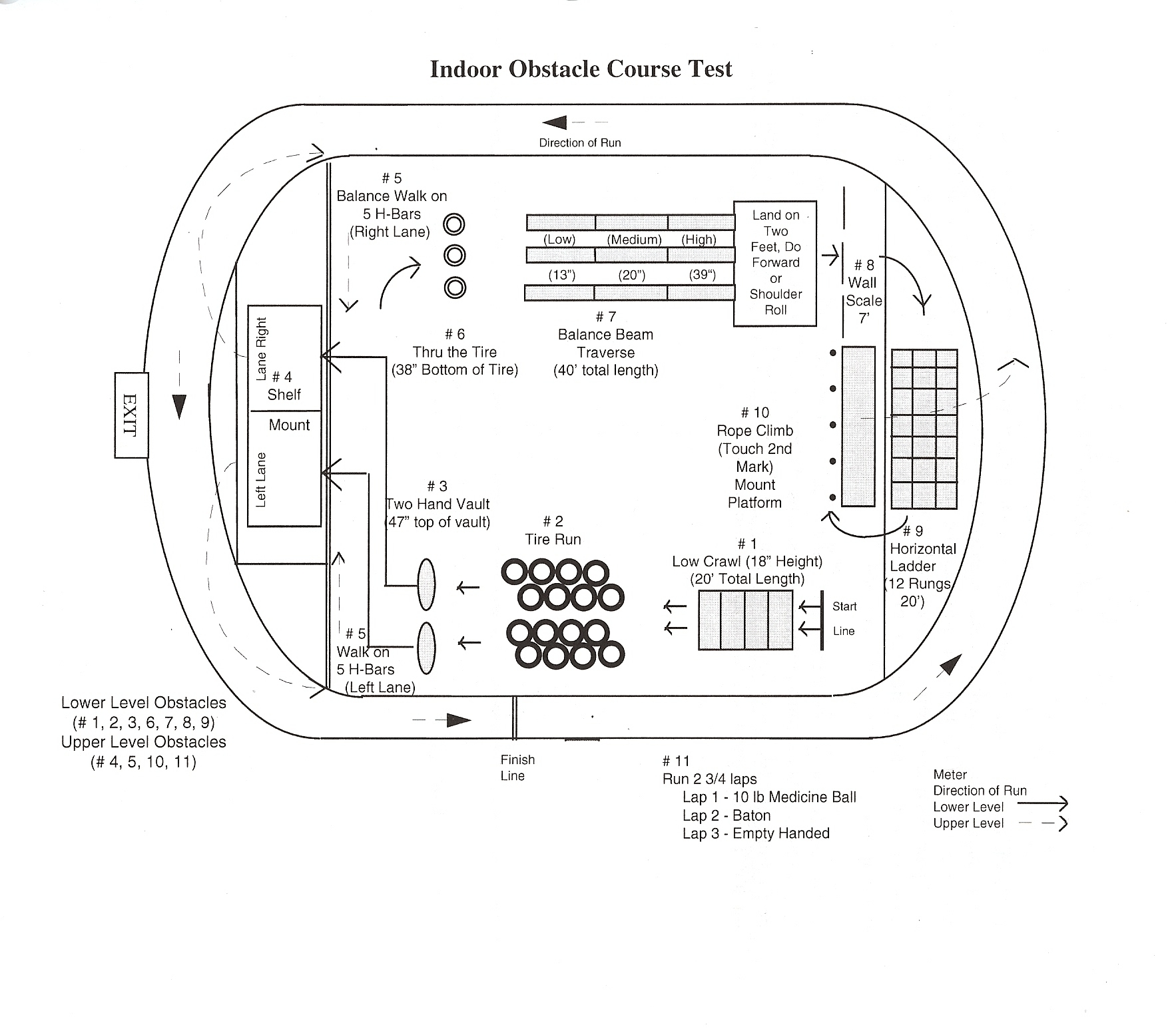
Layout of the current IOCT Course

The IOCT is similar to the obstacle course seen on the TV show American Gladiators, with a quarter-mile sprint at the conclusion of the course. The IOCT is administered throughout the academic year based on dates published by DPE. There are primary testing dates in both Fall and Spring semesters; generally, the dates are dependent upon class year and regiment. Cadets take the IOCT at different time throughout the year because of participation in semester abroad, in-season Club or Corps Squad teams, or injury. Large crowds of cadets, tactical officers, and other onlookers gather for the running of the IOCT. The IOCT is often referenced in articles concerning high intensity human performance, especially involving obstacle courses. This is due to the large amount of available data due to the lengthy history of the course. It has been administered, almost without changes, since 1944.

==== Test sequence ====
The Test consists of 11 events performed sequentially: low crawl under barrier, tire footwork, two-handed vault, 8' horizontal shelf, horizontal bar navigation, hanging tire, balance beam, 8' horizontal wall, 20' horizontal ladder, 16' vertical rope, and 350m sprint carrying a 9 lb medicine ball for the first 120m. The test has not changed much since 1948.

== Competitive sports ==
DPE is also responsible for the administration of a robust competitive sports program at the academy. All Cadets must participate in one of three athletic categories: an NCAA Intercollegiate Sports Team (called "Corps Squad"), an authorized Club Sport Team (called "Club Squad"), or an intramural sport team – known at West Point as "Company Athletics". About 20% of all Cadets are Corps Squad, about 15% are Club Squad, and about 65% are Company Athletes.

DPE's Competitive Sports Committee, headed by Dr. Ralph Pim, has been national recognized as one of the 15 Most Influential Sports Education Teams in the country by the Institute for International Sport. Dr. Pim's Committee oversees the Club and Company Athletic programs, while the Director of Intercollegiate Athletics (DIA) oversees the NCAA sports program.

=== Club sports ===
West Point currently fields 24 club teams in the following sports: boxing, crew, cycling, equestrian, fencing, in-line hockey, judo, lacrosse (W), marathon, martial arts, mixed martial arts (MMA), mountaineering, orienteering, rifle & pistol, rugby (M&W), sailing, skiing (alpine & Nordic), team handball (M&W), triathlon, volleyball (M), and water polo. Since 2000, academy club teams have won 22 national championships, making West Point's club program one of the premier competitive club programs in the nation. In 2008, West Point had four national championship teams: cycling, orienteering, men's team handball, and boxing.

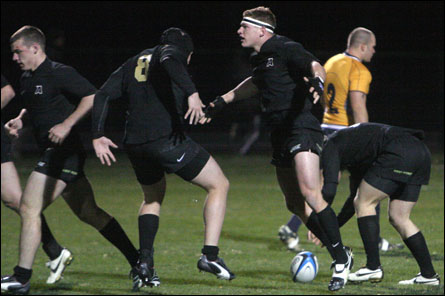
Army Rugby: Both men's & women's teams are nationally competitive.

A list of recent Club Team National Championships:

- 2011 – Cycling
- 2010 – Triathlon
- 2008 – Orienteering
- 2008 – Women's Pistol
- 2008 – Men's Team Handball
- 2008, 2009 – Boxing
- 2008 – Combat Weapons
- 2007 – Women's Team Handball
- 2007 – Cycling
- 2006 – Pistol

=== Company athletics ===
Every cadet who does not compete on a Varsity or Club sport must participate in a Company-level athletic sport. About 65% of all cadets compete in Company Athletics. The Department of Physical Education's (DPE) Competitive Sports Committee, headed by Dr. Ralph Pim, runs the Club and Company Athletics sports program and was named one of the 15 Most Influential Sports Education Teams in America by the Institute for International Sport. Each Company in the Corps of Cadets (total of 32) fields a team in the following sports:

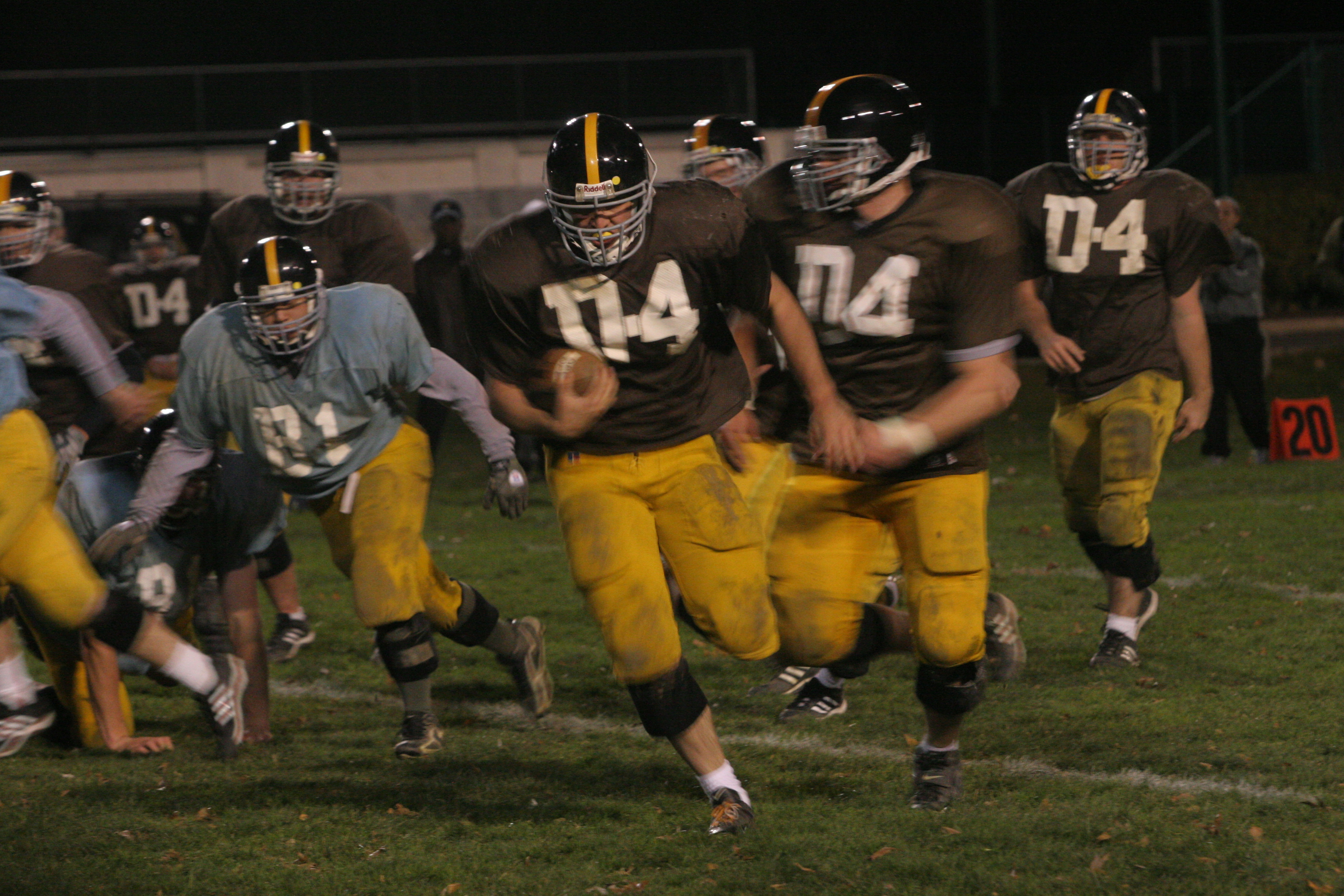
2008 Company Athletic Football Finals: D4 def B1 26–20 in 2OT

Fall Season	Spring Season
Basketball	Combative Grappling
Handball	Floor Hockey
Football	Orienteering
Soccer	Rugby
Ultimate Frisbee	Sandhurst
Wrestling	Swimming

Each company fields a team entry into the annual Sandhurst Competition, a military skills event conducted by the Department of Military Instruction in late Spring each year. Participation in Sandhurst counts as spring Company Athletic credit. Many companies train year-round for this prestigious event. The championship game of CA football and other outdoor events are held each year on Daly Field.
