= Hayes Gymnasium =

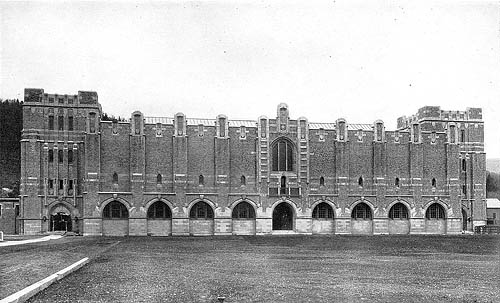
- Hayes Gymnasium, USMA, West Point, NY
- Interactive map of the Hayes Gymnasium area
- Former names: East Gymnasium

General information
- Type: Gymnasium
- Architectural style: Neogothic
- Location: West Point, New York
- Coordinates: 41°23′35″N 73°57′39″W
- Construction started: 1906
- Completed: 1910
- Client: United States Military Academy
- Owner: US Army

Design and construction
- Architect: Cram, Goodhue, & Ferguson

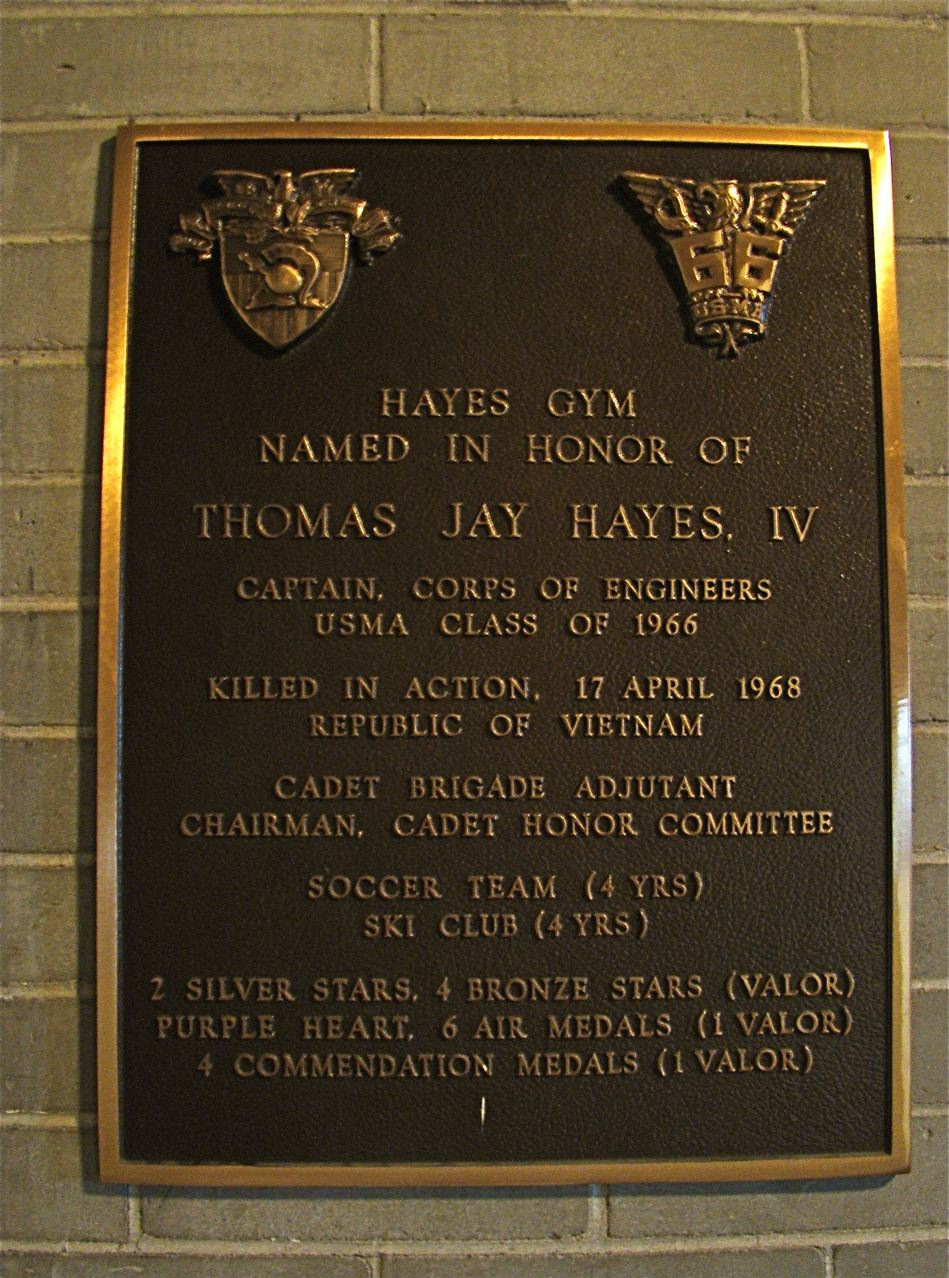
Plaque dedicating the gym in honor of CPT Thomas J. Hayes

Hayes Gymnasium, completed in 1910, is the oldest section of the current Arvin Cadet Physical Development Center at the United States Military Academy. Originally built as an independent structure to replace the academy's previous Richard Morris Hunt-built gymnasium which had served between 1891 and 1910, it was part of a large contract bid awarded to the Boston architectural firm of Cram, Goodhue, & Ferguson in 1903.

Formerly the East Gym, it was renamed in 1989 for 1st Lt. (posthumously promoted Captain) Thomas Jay Hayes IV, Class of 1966, killed in action in Vietnam on 17 April 1968.

== Description ==
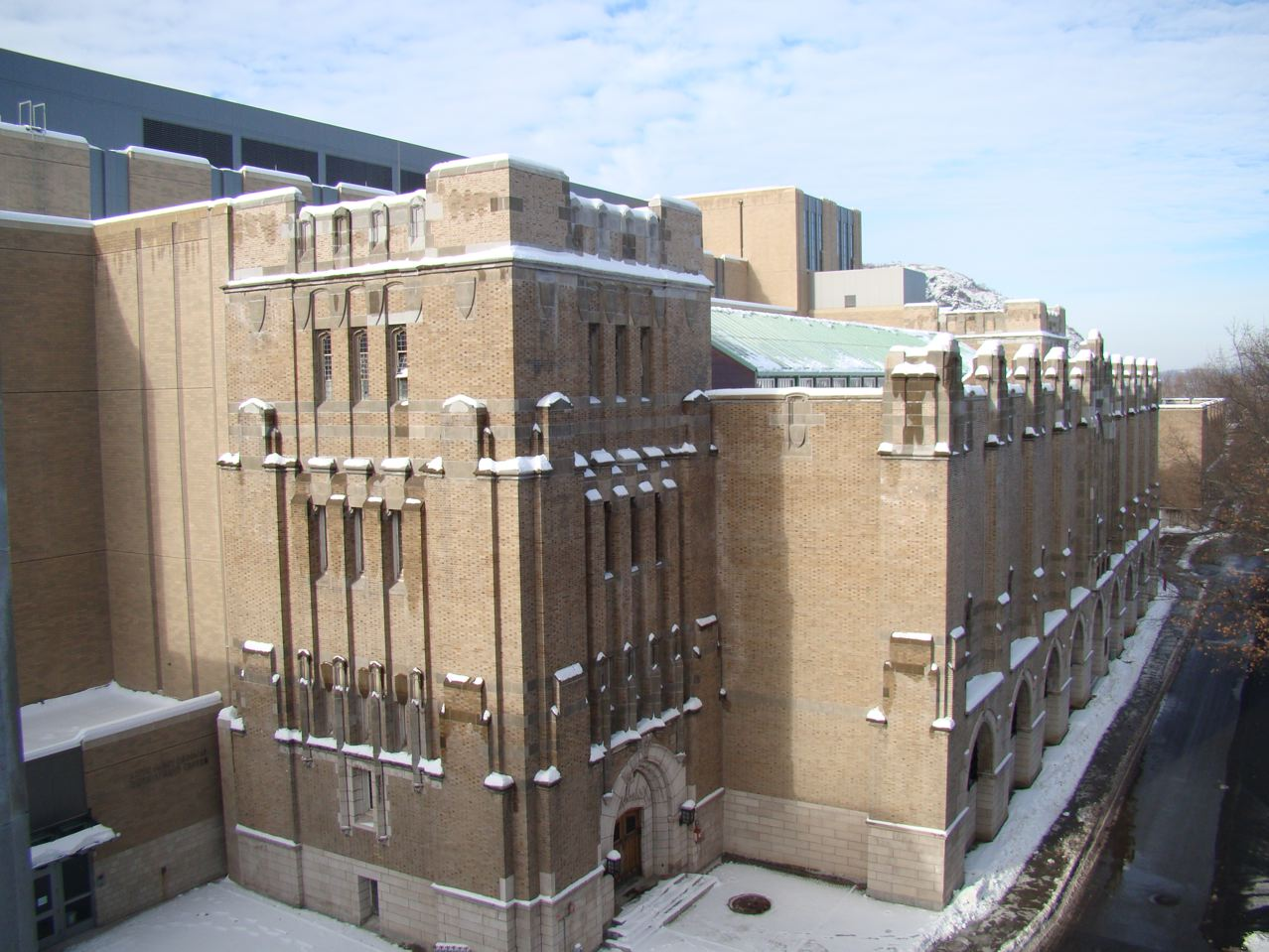
Hayes gym as viewed from Scott barracks, Dec 2008

Hayes gym is a two-level gymnasium first built in 1910. It is now incorporated into the larger Arvin Cadet Physical Development Center. The gym's first floor underwent extensive renovation during recent rebuild of the overall Arvin gym complex, while the "main room" of the gym received new ventilation and roofing. The first floor the houses two large rooms that are currently utilized as the "Class of 1962 Fitness Center", which is bisected by the "Class of 1957 Hallway". The west wall of Hayes gym was torn down and reconstructed to mesh with the new Arvin gym renovation, which opened in August 2004.

== '62 Fitness Room ==
The Class of 1962 donated an endowment which furnishes and maintains a large fitness center in the first floor of the gym. When originally dedicated, the "'62 Room" comprised the south half of the first floor of Hayes. Originally the room was furnished with weight machines and cardio equipment. It is utilized as an expanded "cardio" room, with treadmills, stationary bicycles, stair climbers, and other cardio equipment. The north half of Hayes gym was formerly the boxing instruction room(s), but they have now been combined to form one large room that houses weight machines, exercise mats, and balance and stretching equipment.

== '57 Hallway ==
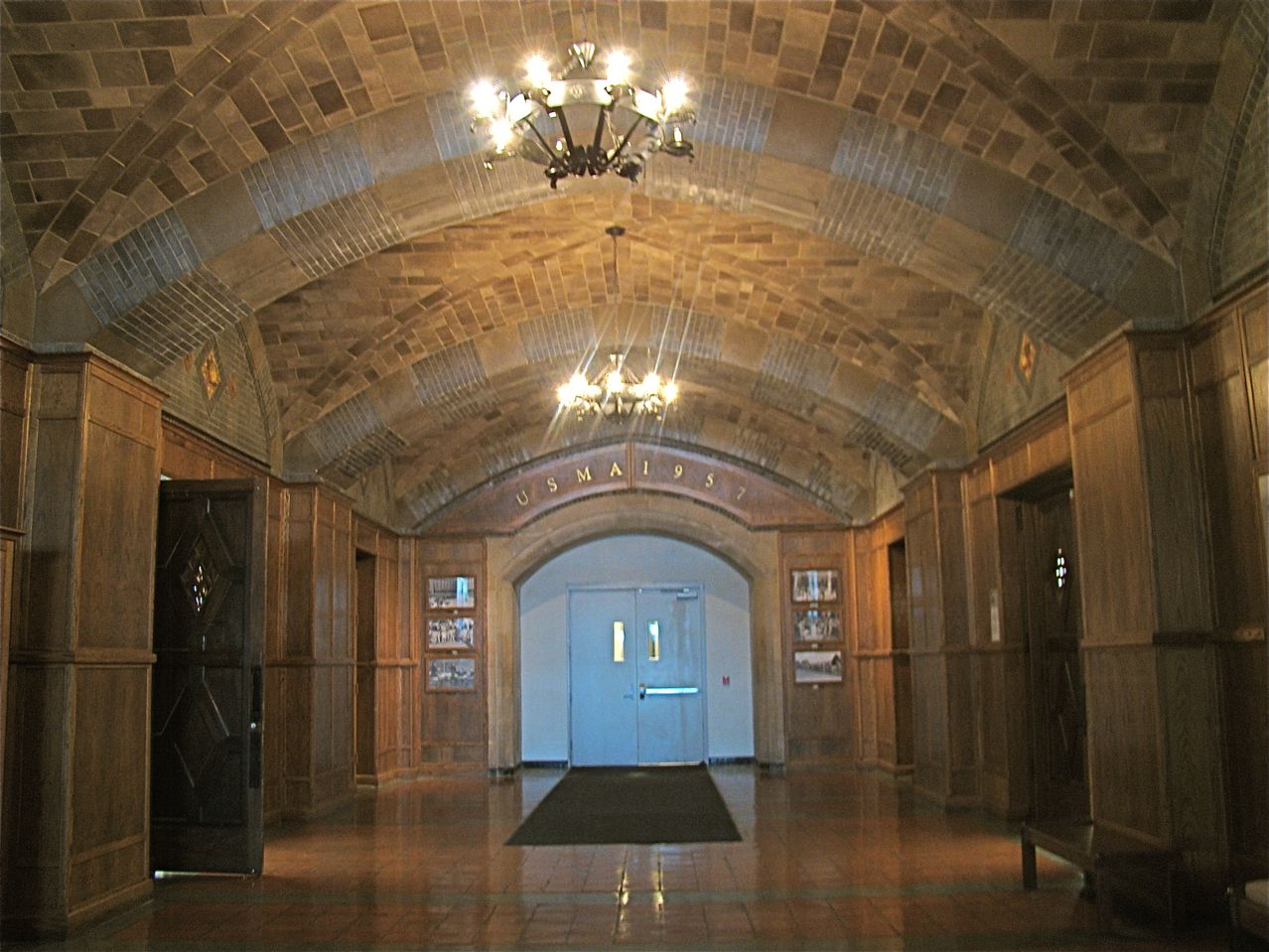
Class of '57 hallway

A wide hallway bisects the two main rooms on the first floor, running east–west. The academy has maintained the gothic interior architecture of this hallway during the many different renovations of Hayes. Maintained by a gift from the class of 1957, this un-renovated section of the building is a link to the gym's past when it was not only a place of exercise, but also housed the cadet restaurant and was a place for social gatherings. Formal ceremonies are occasionally held in this large hallway because of its "old-fashioned" look.

== Hayes military movement laboratory ==
The second level of Hayes is what most cadets and USMA graduates think of as "Hayes Gym". It is a large open gym with a vaulted ceiling, hardwood floor, and elevated track (11.7 laps to a mile) that rings the room. The Department of Physical Education (DPE), USMA, teaches applied gymnastics (called "Military Movement") in Hayes, taking advantage of its historical and unusual support structures. The gym has eighteen 21' vertical ropes and two 60' horizontal ropes (suspended 12' from the floor). There are also 10 pull-up bars that are re 5' wide each and are suspended from the ceiling from vertical supports in such a manner that they can be "run across" (with proper technique), as is done during the IOCT. The gym's floor space is filled with gymnastic's apparatus and pads, such as vaults, bars, and rings as well as 1" and 4" tumbling mats. Prior to the reconstruction of the new Arvin CPDC, Hayes was also used for its basketball court, as three undersized courts fit side by side with the backboards suspended from the track structure. With the completion of the new gym and the six dedicated basketball courts in other parts of Arvin, DPE has removed the rims from the Hayes backboards and no longer uses it as a basketball or team handball facility, allowing the military movement equipment to remain in place year-round.
