= Vault (urban movement) =

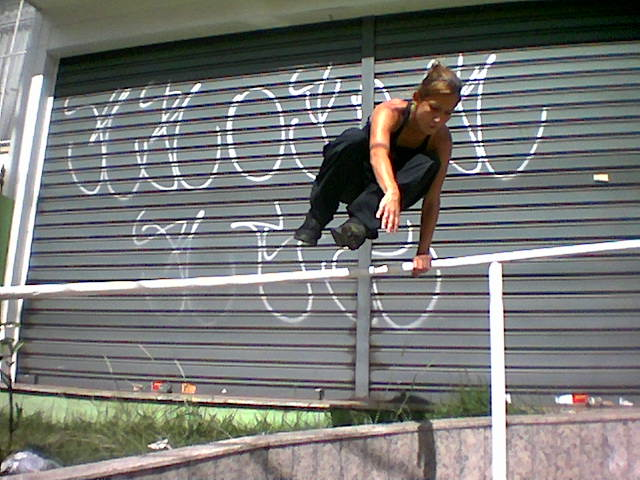
A traceur vaults an obstacle.

In various urban activities, a vault is any type of movement that involves overcoming an obstacle by some combination of jumping, climbing or diving. Although parkour does not involve the idea of set movements, practitioners use similar ways of moving to pass quickly and efficiently over obstacles.

== Parkour vaults ==
- Safety vault/Step Vault: Similar to a side vault, except that the outside foot is placed on the obstacle and the inside arm is then released, while the outside foot pushes the traceur off the obstacle.
- Speed vault: Like a step/safety vault, the outside hand is placed on the obstacle to act as a support, although, the inner leg launches the performer upwards and kicks over the obstacle and the outside foot is forced backwards to force the performer further. The performer lands upon the inner foot and continues running. Or, both legs kick up and over the obstacle like a side vault.
- Two-handed/Simple/Side vault: Both hands are placed on the obstacle and the body goes alongside the arms, with the legs parallel to the obstacle.
- Lazy vault: Approach the object from a parallel or diagonal direction. The inside hand goes on the object and the inside leg and then the outside leg are swung over the object in one fluid motion. The other hand is then placed on the object to stabilize and help propel the vaulter over the object.

Gif of a Lazy Vault

- Thief vault: Similar to the lazy vault, except the inside hand touches the obstacle and the outside leg goes over first. This is usually used to change directions fairly quickly.
- Monkey vault/Kong vault: Both hands are placed on the obstacle and are used to push the traceur over the obstacle while both legs are pulled up into a squat position with the hips raised to pass over the object. Can also be done in a diving motion over the obstacle.
- Double Kong vault: A diving Kong vault with a monkey vault going into the move so that the hands are placed twice on the object.
- Dash vault: A jump is performed over an object feet first while the hands are then placed down to carry oneself over. The result will be a sitting position halfway through the vault with the arms used to push off the obstacle.
- Kash vault: A combination of the Kong/Monkey and a dash vault. The execution is similar to a monkey vault, except at the end of the vault, the traceur pushes them-self up in order to give some space for the legs to exit as a dash vault.
- Turn vault: Similar to a side vault but with a 180 degree turn. One hand is usually placed in the underhand position while the other is placed on it normally and a 180 degree turn us performed typically landing in a cat grab.
- Lazy turn: A lazy vault, but with a turn to land in a cat position.
- Pop vault: The traceur will run at a wall and pop off the wall and propel them-self upward to overcome the obstacle and vault over it.
- Gate vault: One hand is placed on top of an obstacle's surface while the other hand is placed on the side of the object and the traceur flips over the object. This move is typically done on gates or walls.
- Reverse vault: Performing a backspin over an object while placing either one or both hands on the object to control the motion and to push off.
- Reverse kong: A jump similar to a dash vault is performed, but a 180 degree turn is performed before the hands are placed down as in a kong vault and the traceur pushes off the object and turns back around to face forward.
- Dive roll: A dive over an obstacle with a roll to withstand the shock at the end.
- Drop vault: Any vault followed by a drop.
- Wall run: An upward run up a wall. Can also be a run along the wall in a parallel motion to the ground.
- Cat grab: Clinging to an obstacle in a squat position.
- Cat leap: To jump for distance and go into a cat grab.

== Freerunning vaults ==
Many vaults are used for style rather than speed and efficiency as in Parkour

- 360 vault: Like a side vault, but with a 360-degree turn over the object.
- Triple Kong: A kong with three taps.
- Screwdriver: A kong with a 360 performed after the hands are placed.
- Stinger vault: A kong with a 360 dive before the hands are placed.
- 360 Underbar: An underbar performed with a 360 rotation during the move
- Vert vault: Hands are placed in a regular vault fashion but one leg is kicked up over one's head.
- Rocket vault: Done in a lazy fashion, both legs go together and are perfectly straight, and the feet are grabbed by the traceur's hand.
- Star vault: A cartwheel over an obstacle.
- Sky vault: A one-handed cartwheel over an obstacle.
- Shoulder vault: To roll over an obstacle as efficiently as possible.
- Barrel vault: A double legged reverse vault over the obstacle with one hand placed on it for balance and control.
- Thief 360: A thief vault but with a 360-degree twist. It is usually immediately followed by a roll.
- Palm spin: A spin on an object landing on the same side as in the takeoff.
- Inside monkey: A monkey vault but the legs are outside the arms; the legs are still bent monkey-style.
- Inside dash: A dash vault but the legs are outside the arms.
- Dash 360: A dash with a 360-degree twist performed either before or after the dash.
- Weave: Practitioner goes through an opening (for example, between two bars) and quickly comes out the other side.
- Monkey roll: A monkey vault followed by a roll, without landing on your feet before the roll.
- Butterfly vault: A side vault with a butterfly kick performed over the object.
- Straddle vault: Performing a split in a mid air vault.
- Split One: A lazy vault with a split performed after the traceur is over the object.
- Leopard vault: Leaping from a higher object to a lower one placing slapping hands on lower wall and pushing off.
- Scissor Vault: In a lazy motion, but the legs move side by side in a scissor like cutting motion.
- Gate flare: Like a gate vault, but with the legs perfectly straight.
- Rail flip: Two hands are placed on top of the obstacle and a front handspring is executed.
- Cast bomb: A reverse Kong to a cast away.
- Monkey gainer: A monkey vault, but with a gainer performed before the feet touch the ground.
- Kong gainer: Similar to a monkey gainer, but with a Kong performed
- Dash bomb: A dash vault, but with a front flip performed while still in midair.
- Dash barani: A dash bomb with a barani, or 180 front flip, instead of a regular front flip.
- Dash gainer: A dash vault performed with a gainer while still in midair. This move has yet to be landed.

== Combination of vaults ==
- Magic vault: A side vault to a speed vault to lazy vault.
- Kong to cat
- Kong to precision
- Kong to handstand
- Screwdriver to kong
- Double kong to cat
