= Dennis J. Murphy =

United States Marine Corps general (1932–2023)

Dennis Murphy
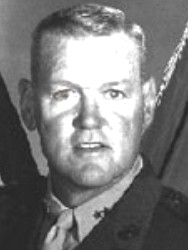
- Born: 8 January 1932; New York, New York, United States
- Died: 28 August 2023 (aged 91); Wyckoff, New Jersey, United States
- Burial place: Arlington National Cemetery, Arlington, Virginia, United States
- Military career
- Allegiance: United States
- Branch: United States Marine Corps
- Service years: 1953–1987
- Rank: Major general
- Commands: Marine Detachment, USS Bennington (CVA-20); 2nd Battalion, 9th Marine Regiment; Battalion Landing Team 2/9; The Basic School; 2nd Marine Division
- Conflicts: Cold War; Vietnam War

Dennis J. Murphy (8 January 1932 – 28 August 2023) was a major general in the United States Marine Corps who served as commanding officer of the 2nd Marine Division from 1984 until his retirement in 1987. He graduated in 1953 from Georgetown University, where he played for the Georgetown Hoyas basketball team.

== Early life ==
Dennis Joseph Murphy was born in New York City on 8 January 1932. He graduated from Cardinal Hayes High School in the Bronx, New York, in 1949 and matriculated in the fall of 1949 at the Georgetown University College of Arts & Sciences in Washington, D.C.

A 6-foot-5-inch (1.96 m) forward, he became a member of Georgetown's varsity basketball team in the fall of 1950, and played as a reserve for the next three seasons. During his sophomore season in 1950–1951, he played in 22 games, scoring in double figures seven times, with a season-high 16 against George Washington. He appeared in 24 games during his junior year in 1951–1952 and 17 in his senior year in 1952–1953, during the latter season scoring a career-high 19 points in a game against George Washington, completing his three-year college basketball career with a total of 60 points scored against George Washington. Georgetown reached the 1953 National Invitation Tournament in his senior year, and as a senior he finished fourth on the team in scoring with 8.9 points per game.

With a double major in history and government, Murphy graduated with a bachelor of social science (B.S.S.) degree in 1953.

== Military career ==
Murphy joined the United States Marine Corps during commencement from Georgetown. He was commissioned as a second lieutenant in December 1953. He served as a rifle platoon commander, participating in the development of vertical assault doctrine and in atomic bomb tests. After graduating from the United States Army Ranger School, he served as series instructor at Marine Corps Recruit Depot San Diego in San Diego, California. He then commanded the Marine Detachment aboard the United States Navy attack aircraft carrier USS Bennington (CVA-20). From 1961 to 1964 he commanded a rifle company and the anti-tank company of the 1st Marine Brigade in Hawaii.

Murphy next completed the Amphibious Warfare School and the Nuclear Weapons Employment Course, then served in the Operations Section of Fleet Marine Force, Atlantic. In July 1967 he began an assignment as executive officer of the 2nd Battalion, 9th Marine Regiment, in South Vietnam, where the Vietnam War was raging. In July 1968 he became operations officer of the 3rd Marine Regiment (Reinforced), operating along the Vietnamese Demilitarized Zone.

Returning to the United States, Murphy completed the Marine Corps Command and Staff College, then was assigned to Headquarters Marine Corps, where he had duty until August 1972 as Ground Lieutenant Colonel Monitor and Head, Ground Officers Control Unit in the Personnel Department.

In 1973, Murphy earned a master's degree in international affairs from The George Washington University. He also completed studies at the National War College in June 1973. He then reported to the 3rd Marine Division on Okinawa, where he took command of the 2nd Battalion, 9th Marine Regiment. He later served as commanding officer of Battalion Landing Team 2/9 in Australia until June 1974.

Again returning to the United States, Murphy served as Special Assistant and Marine Corps Aide to the Assistant Secretary of the Navy for Manpower and Reserve Affairs. In September 1976 he became Head, Leadership Instruction Department, at Marine Corps Base Quantico, Virginia. In August 1977 he assumed command of The Basic School. During his tour at The Basic School, he was selected for promotion to brigadier general.

Murphy received his promotion to brigadier general in July 1979 and began an assignment as assistant division commander of the 2nd Marine Division at Camp Lejeune, North Carolina. In July 1980 he was assigned duty as assistant chief of staff for plans at ROK/US Combined Forces Command in Seoul, South Korea. He became Deputy Commander, Fleet Marine Force, Pacific in Hawaii in July 1982. Promoted to major general in March 1983, he became deputy chief of staff for manpower and Director, Personnel Management Division at Headquarters Marine Corps in June 1983.

Murphy assumed command of the 2nd Marine Division at Camp Lejeune on 29 August 1984. He remained in command of the division until 29 October 1987 and retired in November 1987 after 34 years of service in the Marine Corps.

== Later life ==
In retirement, Murphy resided in Norfolk, Virginia. He served as executive director of the Hampton Roads Naval Historical Foundation until February 2003. As of October 2005 he still resided in Norfolk.

== Personal life ==
Murphy married the former Dorothy Therese Madden in 1954. They had three children — Grace Marie (Jack), Stephen F. X., and Brian — seven grandchildren, and nine great-grandchildren. Both of his sons predeceased him.

== Death ==
Murphy died in Wyckoff, New Jersey, on 28 August 2023 at the age of 91. He is buried at Arlington National Cemetery in Arlington, Virginia.

== Honors and awards ==
- Navy Distinguished Service Medal
- Defense Superior Service Medal
- Purple Heart
- Legion of Merit (two awards, one with Combat "V")
- Korea Defense Service Medal
- Vietnam Service Medal
- Cheon-Su Medal (Republic of Korea)
- Gallanty Cross (Republic of Vietnam)
