= 1936–37 Georgetown Hoyas men's basketball team =

American college basketball season

1936–37 Georgetown Hoyas men's basketball
- Conference: Eastern Intercollegiate Conference
- Record: 9–8 (3-7 EIC)
- Head coach: Fred Mesmer (6th season)
- Captain: Mike Petrosky
- Home arena: Tech Gymnasium

1936–37 Eastern Intercollegiate Conference men's basketball standings
	Conf.				Overall
Team	W		L	PCT	W		L	PCT
Temple	7	–	3	.700	17	–	6	.739
Pittsburgh†	7	–	3	.700	14	–	7	.667
Penn State	6	–	4	.600	10	–	7	.588
Carnegie Tech	4	–	6	.400	9	–	11	.450
Georgetown	3	–	7	.300	9	–	8	.529
West Virginia	3	–	7	.300	9	–	14	.391
† Postseason conference championship playoff game winner As of end of 1936-37 season

The 1936–37 Georgetown Hoyas men's basketball team represented Georgetown University during the 1936–37 NCAA college basketball season. Fred Mesmer coached it in his sixth season as head coach. The team was a member of the Eastern Intercollegiate Conference (EIC) and played its home games at Tech Gymnasium on the campus of McKinley Technical High School in Washington, D.C. The team finished with a record of 9–8 overall, 3–7 in the EIC.

== Season recap ==
Sophomore guard Ed Kurtyka and sophomore forward Joe Murphy joined the team this season. Georgetown made its first-ever visit to Madison Square Garden to play New York University in the third game of the season, and Murphy scored 11 points in the first of 17 games in which he would score in double figures during his 65-game collegiate career. Kurtyka led the team in scoring for the season, while Murphy averaged 4.9 points per game and finished the year second highest in scoring behind Kurtyka.

Junior forward Harry Bassin saw less playing time than he had the previous season and averaged a career-low 4.0 points per game, but he nonetheless was an important force in games and scored a season-high 12 points against Syracuse in a Georgetown victory that ended a multi-year Syracuse home winning streak. Junior forward and team captain Mike Petrosky averaged a career-low 4.3 points per game for the season but put in a strong defensive and rebounding performance.

Despite playing only six home games all season, the 1936–37 Hoyas finished with a record of 9–8, only the second winning season for Georgetown in the last seven. In non-conference games they had gone 6–1, but they had struggled in EIC games, finishing with a conference record of 3–7. The 1936–37 squad was the second and last of Mesmer's teams to finish with an overall winning record.

== Roster ==
Junior guard Tom Nolan would go on to serve as Georgetown's head basketball coach from 1956 to 1960, and as the school's baseball coach until the end of the 1978 season.

#	Name	Height	Weight (lbs.)	Position	Class	Hometown	Previous Team(s)
3	Joe Murphy	6'0"	N/A	F	So.	West New York, NJ, U.S.	Memorial HS
51	Karl Nau	N/A	N/A	G	Sr.	Washington, DC, U.S.	Central HS
52	Don Gibeau	N/A	N/A	G	Sr.	Syracuse, NY, U.S.	Christian Brothers Academ
53	Ed Kurtyka	N/A	N/A	G	So.	Washington, DC, U.S.	Eastern HS
54	Harry Bertrand	N/A	N/A	F	Jr.	N/A	N/A
55	Mario Gregorio	5'8"	N/A	G	Jr.	Washington, DC, U.S.	Central HS
80	Tom Nolan	N/A	N/A	F	Jr.	Washington, DC, U.S.	Eastern HS
81	Johnny Frank	N/A	N/A	F	Jr.	Tuckahoe, NY, U.S.	Horace Greeley HS
82	Carroll Shore	N/A	N/A	G	So.	Washington, DC, U.S.	Central HS
83	Ben Zola	N/A	N/A	G	Sr.	Washington, DC, U.S.	Eastern HS
84	Harry Bassin	N/A	N/A	G	Jr.	Washington, DC, U.S.	Eastern HS
85	Mike Petrosky	6'4"	N/A	C	Jr.	New London, CT, U.S.	Bulkeley HS

== 1936–37 schedule and results ==
Date time, TV	Opponent	Result	Record	Site city, state
Regular Season
Mon., Dec. 14, 1936* no, no	Western Maryland	W 46–16	1-0	Tech Gymnasium; Washington, DC
Wed., Dec. 16, 1936* no, no	at Princeton	W 25–22	2-0	University Gymnasium; Princeton, NJ
Wed., Dec. 30, 1936* no, no	at New York University	W 46–40	3-0	Madison Square Garden; New York, NY
Wed., Jan. 6, 1937 no, no	at Carnegie Tech	L 17–25	3-1 (0-1)	Skibo Gymnasium; Pittsburgh, PA
Thu., Jan. 7, 1937 no, no	at West Virginia	L 32–41	3-2 (0-2)	WVU Field House; Morgantown, WV
Wed., Jan. 13, 1937 no, no	at Temple	L 27–29	3-3 (0-3)	Mitten Hall; Philadelphia, PA
Wed., Jan. 20, 1937 no, no	Pittsburgh	W 30–27	4-3 (1-3)	Tech Gymnasium; Washington, DC
Mon., Feb. 1, 1937 no, no	Temple	W 49–44	5-3 (2-3)	Tech Gymnasium; Washington, DC
Mon., Feb. 8, 1937 no, no	West Virginia	W 51–23	6-3 (3-3)	Tech Gymnasium; Washington, DC
Wed., Feb. 10, 1937* no, no	at Army	W 40–37	7-3	Hayes Gymnasium; West Point, NY
Thu., Feb. 11, 1937* no, no	at Yale	L 26–48	7-4	Payne Whitney Gymnasium; New Haven, CT
Sat., Feb. 13, 1937* no, no	at Syracuse; Rivalry	W 45–36	8-4	Archbold Gymnasium; Syracuse, NY
Fri., Feb. 19, 1937 no, no	Carnegie Tech	L 25–32	8-5 (3-4)	Tech Gymnasium; Washington, DC
Sat., Feb. 20, 1937* no, no	at Maryland	W 37–29	9-5	Ritchie Coliseum; College Park, MD
Tue., Mar. 2, 1937 no, no	at Pittsburgh	L 22–39	9-6 (3-5)	Pitt Pavilion; Pittsburgh, PA
Wed., Mar. 3, 1937 no, no	at Penn State	L 24–34	9-7 (3-6)	Recreation Hall; State College, PA
Sat., Mar. 13, 1937 no, no	Penn State	L 34–51	9-8 (3-7)	Tech Gymnasium; Washington, DC
*Non-conference game. (#) Tournament seedings in parentheses.
