= 1950–51 Georgetown Hoyas men's basketball team =

American college basketball season

1950–51 Georgetown Hoyas men's basketball
- Conference: Independent
- Record: 8–14
- Head coach: Francis "Buddy" O'Grady (2nd season)
- Assistant coach: Dominic Cara (1st season)
- Captain: Danny Supkis
- Home arena: Uline Arena

The 1950–51 Georgetown Hoyas men's basketball team represented Georgetown University during the 1950–51 NCAA college basketball season. Francis "Buddy" O'Grady coached it in his second season as head coach. The team was an independent and moved to Uline Arena in Washington, D.C., for its home games this season. It finished with a record of 8–14 and had no post-season play.

== Season recap ==
The 1950–51 team was a youthful one, with a roster that included only one senior and four juniors, the other ten players being sophomores. Seven of those sophomores had arrived on the varsity team from a freshman team that had had great success the previous year, posting a 16–1 record.

Sophomore center Bill Bolger was among the new arrivals. Playing in all 22 games, he scored 20 or more points in five of the final 11 games of the season, averaging 12.7 points per game for the year.

Another standout sophomore was guard Barry Sullivan, who debuted in the first game of the season with 22 points against Geneva. He followed that by scoring in double figures in 16 of the next 17 games, including 25 points against Long Island and another 25-point performance against American in the next game five days later. He missed the last four games of the season due to illness, but averaged a team-leading 16.1 points per game for the season.

Sophomore center Hugh Beins scored in double figures in seven of eight games at midseason and had a season-high 19 points against Mount St. Mary's. His performance tailed off later in the season, but he would return for two more years as one of the top players in Georgetown history.

The young and inexperienced team started with an 8–6 record but ended the season with an eight-game losing streak that gave it a final record of 8–14. It had no post-season play and was not ranked in the Top 20 in the Associated Press Poll or in the Top 30 in the Coaches' Poll – which began this season – at any time.

No Georgetown men's basketball team had played its home games on campus since the 1926–27 team had used Ryan Gymnasium as its home court, but the 1950–51 squad was the last Georgetown men's basketball team to play its home games in an off-campus facility until the 1981–82 team moved to the Capital Centre in Landover, Maryland. Ground had been broken on campus for the construction of McDonough Gymnasium, which would host Georgetown's home games for 30 years beginning the next season.

== Roster ==
#	Name	Height	Weight (lbs.)	Position	Class	Hometown	Previous Team(s)
5	Neil Conway	6'5"	N/A	G	Jr.	Ashley, PA, U.S.	Saint Leo's HS
8	Gerry Nappy	6'6"	N/A	G	So.	Teaneck, NJ, U.S.	Xavier HS (New York, NY)
9	Bob Scott	N/A	N/A	F	So.	N/A	N/A
11	Bob Makatura	5'10"	N/A	G	So.	New York, NY, U.S.	St. Francis Preparatory School
13	Tony Durmowicz	6'5"	N/A	F	Jr.	Baltimore, MD, U.S.	Loyola HS
15	Mike Vitale	N/A	N/A	G	Jr.	East Orange, NJ, U.S.	Seton Hall Preparatory School
17	Don O'Leary	6'2"	N/A	G	Jr.	New York, NY, U.S.	La Salle HS
20	Bill Stors	6'5"	N/A	G	Jr.	New York, NY, U.S.	Regis HS
21 (home); 27 (road)	Hugh Beins	6'7"	N/A	C	So.	New York, NY, U.S.	Manhattan Preparatory School
24	Billy Wolfer	6'5"	N/A	F	So.	Allentown, PA, U.S.	Allentown Central Catholic HS
26	Dennis Murphy	6'5"	N/A	G	So.	New York, NY, U.S.	Cardinal Hayes HS
30	Bill Bolger	6'5"	205	F	So.	New York, NY, U.S.	Xavier HS
40	Barry Sullivan	6'1"	N/A	G	So.	New York, NY, U.S.	Regis HS
N/A	Jack Hekker	6'4"	N/A	G	So.	North Arlington, NJ, U.S.	Queen of Peace HS
N/A	Jim Larkins	6'6"	N/A	G	So.	Silver Spring, MD, U.S.	Gonzaga College HS (Washington, DC)
N/A	Danny Supkis	6'7"	N/A	C	Sr.	New York, NY, U.S.	St. Alban's HS

== 1950–51 schedule and results ==
It had been a common practice for many years for colleges and universities to include non-collegiate opponents in their schedules, with the games recognized as part of their official record for the season, and the February 3, 1951, game against the New York Athletic Club therefore counted as part of Georgetown's won-loss record for 1950–51. It was not until 1952 after the completion of the 1951–52 season that the National Collegiate Athletic Association (NCAA) ruled that colleges and universities could no longer count games played against non-collegiate opponents in their annual won-loss records.

Date time, TV	Rank^{#}	Opponent^{#}	Result	Record	Site city, state
Regular Season
Tue., Dec. 5, 1950 no, no		Geneva	W 92–61	1-0	Uline Arena; Washington, DC
Fri., Dec. 8, 1950 no, no		Saint Francis	W 80–59	2-0	Uline Arena; Washington, DC
Mon., Dec. 11, 1950 no, no		at Mount St. Mary's	W 87–62	3-0	Alumni Gymnasium; Emmitsburg, MD
Thu., Dec. 14, 1950 no, no		at Long Island	L 66–75	3-1	Madison Square Garden; New York, NY
Tue., Dec. 19, 1950 no, no		American	W 65–62	4-1	Uline Arena; Washington, DC
Tue., Jan. 9, 1951 no, no		George Washington	L 80–90	4-2	Uline Arena; Washington, DC
Sat., Jan. 13, 1951 no, no		at Maryland	L 47–58	4-3	Ritchie Coliseum; College Park, MD
Sat., Jan. 20, 1951 no, no		at Pennsylvania	L 76–92	4-4	Palestra; Philadelphia, PA
Wed., Jan. 24, 1951 no, no		at Navy	W 58–55	5-4	Dahlgren Hall; Annapolis, MD
Thu., Jan. 25, 1951 no, no		at Gannon	L 62–66	5-5	Gannon Auditorium; Erie, PA
Sat., Jan. 26, 1951 no, no		at Canisius	W 87–76	6-5	Buffalo Memorial Auditorium; Buffalo, NY
Fri., Feb. 2, 1951 no, no		William & Mary	L 64–75	6-6	Uline Arena; Washington, DC
Sat., Feb. 3, 1951 (Note: The Georgetown Basketball History Project states that both the Loyola Maryland game and the New York Athletic Club game took place on February 3, 1951.) no, no		at Loyola Maryland	W 57–48	7-6	Alumni Gymnasium; Baltimore, MD
Sat., Feb. 3, 1951 no, no		at New York Athletic Club	W 62–45	8-6	New York Athletic Club Gymnasium; New York, NY
Wed., Feb. 7, 1951 no, no		Penn State	L 58–70	8-7	Uline Arena; Washington, DC
Wed., Feb. 7, 1951 no, no		Oklahoma City	L 45–51	8-8	Uline Arena; Washington, DC
Tue., Feb. 13, 1951 no, no		La Salle	L 74–79	8-9	Uline Arena; Washington, DC
Fri., Feb. 16, 1951 no, no		Fordham	L 56–61	8-10	Uline Arena; Washington, DC
Mon., Feb. 19, 1951 no, no		Siena	L 48–57	8-11	Uline Arena; Washington, DC
Tue., Feb. 22, 1951 no, no		at North Carolina State	L 83–101	8-12	William Neal Reynolds Coliseum; Raleigh, NC
Sat., Feb. 24, 1951 no, no		George Washington	L 49–74	8-13	Uline Arena; Washington, DC
Tue., Feb. 27, 1951 no, no		Seton Hal	L 78–82	8-14	Uline Arena; Washington, DC
*Non-conference game. ^{#}Rankings from AP Poll. (#) Tournament seedings in parentheses.
