= 1956–57 Georgetown Hoyas men's basketball team =

American college basketball season

1956–57 Georgetown Hoyas men's basketball
- Conference: Independent
- Record: 11–11
- Head coach: Tom Nolan (1st season)
- Assistant coach: Tommy O'Keefe (1st season)
- Captain: Game captains
- Home arena: McDonough Gymnasium

The 1956–57 Georgetown Hoyas men's basketball team represented Georgetown University during the 1956–57 NCAA University Division college basketball season. Tom Nolan coached them in his first season as head coach. The team was an independent and played its home games at McDonough Gymnasium on the Georgetown campus in Washington, D.C. The Hoyas finished with a record of 11–11, the best of Nolan's four-year tenure as head coach and had no post-season play.

Georgetown's new head coach, Tom Nolan, had been a standout on the Georgetown basketball teams of the 1935–36, 1936–37, and 1937–38 seasons and would coach the Hoyas for four seasons. His assistant, who also joined the Hoyas this season, was Tommy O'Keefe, a star Georgetown player of the 1946–47, 1947–48, 1948–49, and 1949–50 seasons who had then played for a season in the National Basketball Association (NBA). In 1960, O'Keefe would succeed Nolan as Georgetown's head coach.

== Season recap ==
Senior forward Warren Buehler, who had taken a leave of absence from the team the previous season, returned this season and played in 20 games, scoring 228 points despite a slow start, with 20 or more points three times in games late in the season. He graduated after the end of the season as the top scorer and second all-time rebounder in Georgetown history at the time, with 1,134 career points and 461 career rebounds.

Senior forward Joe Missett also played in 20 games and scored in double figures in each of them, averaging 15.9 points per game. He was the team's top scorer for the second straight year and became the first Georgetown player in history to lead the team in rebounds in three consecutive seasons.

Senior guard-forward Matt White scored in double figures in all but five games, and over a nine-game stretch scored exactly 16 points six times. Junior forward Ken Pichette averaged 11.0 points per game.

The team finished with a record of 11–11, had no postseason play, and was not ranked in the Top 20 in the Associated Press Poll or Coaches' Poll at any time.

== Roster ==
#	Name	Height	Weight (lbs.)	Position	Class	Hometown	Previous Team(s)
5	Warren Buehler	6"4"	185	F	Sr.	Bayonne, NJ, U.S.	Sweeney HS
6	Jack Wood	N/A	N/A	F	Jr.	Newark, NJ, U.S.	Good Counsel HS
8	John Clark	6'2"	N/A	G	Jr.	Binghamton, NY, U.S.	Saint Patrick HS
9	Dick Percudani	6'1"	N/A	G	Sr.	Elmhurst, NY, U.S.	Power Memorial Academy
11	Les Sweitzer	6'4"	N/A	G	So.	Palmerton, PA, U.S.	Palmerton HS
13	Jack Nies	5'10"	N/A	F	So.	Jersey City, NJ, U.S.	St. Peter's Preparatory School
14	Dale Smith	6'4"	N/A	G	Sr.	Allentown, PA, U.S.	Allentown Central Catholic HS
15	Leo Phillips	6'5"	N/A	F	Sr.	York, PA, U.S.	William Penn HS
17	Ken Pichette	6'3"	185	F	Jr.	Binghamton, NY, U.S.	Central HS
18	Joe Titus	N/A	N/A	F	Jr.	Bradford, PA, U.S.	Bradford Area HS
20	Jim Oravec	6'2"	N/A	F	So.	Palmerton, PA, U.S.	Palmerton HS
21	Dale Seymour	6'5"	N/A	G	Sr.	Washington, DC, U.S.	Gonzaga College HS
22	Joe Missett	6"7"	205	C	Sr.	Villanova, PA, U.S.	Malvern Preparatory School
24	Matt White	6'2"	205	F	Sr.	New York, NY, U.S.	La Salle HS
28	Randolph "Max" Schmeling	6'9"	N/A	C	So.	Spring Grove, PA, U.S.	St. Francis HS

== 1956–57 schedule and results ==
Notes (Note: Sources all agree that Georgetown's record for the season was 11–11, but the schedule posted by The Georgetown Basketball History Project – which also states that the overall record was 11–11 – shows 23 games played, consisting of 12 wins and 11 losses. The 2012-2013 Georgetown Men's Basketball Media Guide, p. 61, only lists 22 games – 11 wins and 11 losses. The extra game listed by The Georgetown Basketball History Project is a 76-60 victory against Muhlenberg, on January 18, 1957. For the following 1957-58 season, The Georgetown Basketball History Project and other sources agree that Georgetown finished with a 10-11 record, but the Project lists only 20 games (9 wins and 11 losses) played. It does not list a Muhlenberg game in the 1957–58 season, but the media guide lists a 76-60 victory over Muhlenberg on an unspecified date that season, apparently in January 1958. It appears that the Georgetown Basketball History Project is mistaken in showing the 76-60 win over Muhlenberg as taking place in January 1957 and that it actually occurred a year later on January 18, 1958. ShrpSports.com confirms Georgetown winning at Muhlenberg 76-60 on January 18, 1958.) (Note: The schedule posted by The Georgetown Basketball History Project shows the two games of the All-American City Tournament in late December 1956, reflected in the table below. The 2012-2013 Georgetown Men's Basketball Media Guide, p. 61, lists the two games as taking place sometime between the Mount St. Mary's and Navy games but provides no dates. An in-season tournament is more likely to have occurred in late December as shown here than in mid-January as suggested by the media guide.)

Date time, TV	Rank^{#}	Opponent^{#}	Result	Record	Site city, state
Regular Season
Sat., Dec. 1, 1956 no, no		Gettysburg	W 85–44	1-0	McDonough Gymnasium; Washington, DC
Sat., Dec. 8, 1956 no, no		at American	W 94–77	2-0	Uline Arena; Washington, DC
Thu., Dec. 13, 1956 no, no		at New York University	W 76–73	3-0	Madison Square Garden; New York, NY
Sat., Dec. 15, 1956 no, no		Baltimore	W 80–71	4-0	McDonough Gymnasium; Washington, DC
Tue., Dec. 18, 1956 no, no		Catholic	W 91–66	5-0	McDonough Gymnasium; Washington, DC
Fri., Dec. 28, 1956 no, no		vs. New Mexico A&M; All-American City Tournament	L 74–80	5-1	N/A; Owensboro, KY
Sun., Dec. 30, 1956 no, no		vs. Montana State; All-American City Tournament	L 71–75	5-2	N/A; Owensboro, KY
Sat., Jan. 5, 1957 no, no		at Saint Peter's	L 70–73	5-3	Jersey City Armory; Jersey City, NJ
Tue., Jan. 8, 1957 no, no		George Washington	W 85–61	6-3	McDonough Gymnasium; Washington, DC
Fri., Jan. 11, 1957 no, no		American	W 89–58	7-3	McDonough Gymnasium; Washington, DC
Mon., Jan. 14, 1957 no, no		at Maryland	L 59–62	7-4	Cole Field House; College Park, MD
Sat., Jan. 19, 1957 no, no		at Mount St. Mary's	L 82–86	7-5	Alumni Gymnasium; Emmitsburg, MD
Sat., Jan. 26, 1957 no, no		Navy	L 66–77	7-6	McDonough Gymnasium; Washington, DC
Sat., Feb. 2, 1957 no, no		at Richmond	L 81–97	7-7	Richmond Arena; Richmond, VA
Tue., Feb. 5, 1957 no, no		La Salle	W 75–65	8-7	McDonough Gymnasium; Washington, DC
Sat., Feb. 9, 1957 no, no		Fordham	L 69–74	8-8	McDonough Gymnasium; Washington, DC
Tue., Feb. 12, 1957 no, no		at Loyola Maryland	W 80–75	9-8	Alumni Gymnasium; Baltimore, MD
Sat., Feb. 16, 1957 no, no		at Seton Hall	L 91–99	9-9	Walsh Gymnasium; South Orange, NJ
Tue., Feb. 19, 1957 no, no		at George Washington	W 83–75	10-9	Uline Arena; Washington, DC
Sat., Feb. 23, 1957 no, no		at Iona	W 88–70	11-9	N/A; New Rochelle, NY
Wed., Feb. 27, 1957 no, no		Maryland	L 69–82	11-10	McDonough Gymnasium; Washington, DC
Sat., Mar. 2, 1957 no, no		at St. Joseph's	L 58–77	11-11	Palestra; Philadelphia, PA
*Non-conference game. ^{#}Rankings from AP Poll. (#) Tournament seedings in parentheses.
