= 1952–53 Georgetown Hoyas men's basketball team =

American college basketball season

1952–53 Georgetown Hoyas men's basketball

Boston Arena Tournament Champions National Invitation Tournament, First Round
- Conference: Independent
- Record: 13–7
- Head coach: Harry "Buddy" Jeannette (1st season)
- Assistant coach: Morgan "Pops" Sweetman (1st season)
- Captain: Bill Bolger
- Home arena: McDonough Gymnasium

The 1952–53 Georgetown Hoyas men's basketball team represented Georgetown University during the 1952–53 NCAA college basketball season. Harry "Buddy" Jeannette – who had played professional basketball from 1938 to 1950 and had coached the original Baltimore Bullets from 1947 to 1951 – coached the 1952–53 Hoyas in his first season as head coach. The team was an independent and played its home games at McDonough Gymnasium on the Georgetown campus in Washington, D.C. It finished with a record of 13–7 – the most successful team of Jeannette's four-year tenure as head coach – and became the first Georgetown men's basketball team ever to be invited to the National Invitation Tournament (NIT), losing to Louisville in the first round of the 1953 NIT.

== Season recap ==
Junior guard Lou Gigante became the team's starting point guard this season. He scored in all 20 of the team's games and in double figures in 11 of the last 15 during the Hoyas' drive for a post-season tournament berth; his 17 points against Navy was particularly notable, and his play at point guard brought the Hoyas close to an upset of a 4th-ranked La Salle team led by Tom Gola.

Although one of the previous season's top scorers, Barry Sullivan, left school for military service and did not return for this season, the other half of that year's scoring tandem, now-senior center and team captain Bill Bolger, did return. He played in all 20 games and led the team in scoring in 11 of them. He had double-figure scoring performances in 18 games, including 29 against Seattle and 26 against Rhode Island back-to-back in the two games of the Boston Arena Tournament in late December 1952 and 17 points against St. Joseph's and 23 against Fordham in big wins later in the year as Georgetown made its push for a postseason tournament bid.

Also starring during the year was senior center Hugh Beins. Beins played in all 20 games and scored in double figures 13 times, with particularly impressive performances against Temple, Virginia, and Fordham and a career-high 23 points against Canisius. He also turned in one of his finest defensive performances against George Washington, holding George Washington star Joe Holup – a 2,000-point, 2,000-rebound player during his collegiate career – to nine points as the Hoyas beat the Colonials in the regular-season finale, Georgetown's only defeat of George Washington during Holup's college years.

The win over Fordham was crucial in convincing the National Invitation Tournament (NIT) selection committee to invite Georgetown to the 1953 NIT, the school's first-ever NIT appearance. It was only the second post-season tournament appearance in Georgetown men's basketball history and the first since the 1942–43 team advanced to the final game of the 1943 NCAA Tournament. In the first round of the NIT, the Hoyas met Louisville at Madison Square Garden. Gigante scored 13 points and Bolger had a team-high 20-point performance. But fouls plagued Georgetown during the game; five Hoyas fouled out, and Louisville made 36 of its 52 free throws and won the game 92–79 to knock Georgetown out of the postseason.

Bolger graduated as the leading scorer in Georgetown history at the time, and the second to score 1,000 points – doing it in three seasons when the only other 1,000-point scorer in school history, Tommy O'Keefe, had taken four seasons to hit that mark. Although rebounds were not tracked in college basketball until the 1953–54 season, it was estimated in 1978 that Bolger may have averaged 17 rebounds per game during his collegiate career.

Georgetown would not appear in a post-season tournament again until the 1969–70 team played in the 1970 NIT.

== Roster ==
#	Name	Height	Weight (lbs.)	Position	Class	Hometown	Previous Team(s)
6	Tommy Doyle	6'0"	N/A	F	Jr.	New York, NY, U.S.	St. Francis Preparatory School
8	Gerry Nappy	6'6"	N/A	G	Sr.	Teaneck, NJ, U.S.	Xavier HS (New York, NY)
9	Jim Larkins	6'6"	N/A	G	Sr.	Silver Spring, MD, U.S.	Gonzaga College HS (Washington, DC)
10	Jack Vail	6'0"	N/A	F	So.	South Amboy, NJ, U.S.	St. Mary High School
11	Bob Makatura	5'10"	N/A	G	Sr.	New York, NY, U.S.	St. Francis Preparatory School
13	Lou Gigante	5'9"	N/A	G	Jr.	New York, NY, U.S.	Cardinal Hayes HS
20	Bob Stuhr	6'1"	N/A	G	Sr.	Garden City, NY, U.S.	Garden City HS
21 (home); 27 (road)	Hugh Beins	6'7"	N/A	C	Sr.	New York, NY, U.S.	Manhattan Preparatory School
22	Joe Carroll	N/A	N/A	G	Jr.	Baltimore, MD, U.S.	Calvert Hall College HS
24	Billy Wolfer	6'5"	N/A	F	Sr.	Allentown, PA, U.S.	Allentown Central Catholic HS
26	Dennis Murphy	6'5"	N/A	G	Sr.	New York, NY, U.S.	Cardinal Hayes HS
30	Bill Bolger	6'5"	205	F	Sr.	New York, NY, U.S.	Xavier HS
N/A	Alan (Ed) Bontempo	N/A	N/A	G	Sr.	Newark, NJ, U.S.	N/A
N/A	Jack Hekker	6'4"	N/A	G	Sr.	North Arlington, NJ, U.S.	Queen of Peace HS

== Rankings ==
The 1952–53 squad was ranked 20th in the Associated Press Poll on January 13, 1953. Although only ranked for a week, it was the first team in Georgetown men's basketball history to be ranked in the poll. No Georgetown men's team would be ranked in the AP Poll again until the 1977-78 season.

The 1952–53 team was not ranked in the Coaches' Poll at any time.

Ranking movement Legend: ██ Improvement in ranking. ██ Decrease in ranking. ██ Not ranked the previous week. RV=Others receiving votes.
Poll	Wk 1	Wk 2	Wk 3	Wk 4	Wk 5	Wk 6	Wk 7	Wk 8	Wk 9	Wk 10	Wk 11	Wk 12	Wk 13	Final
AP					20									
Coaches														

== 1952–53 schedule and results ==
Date time, TV	Rank^{#}	Opponent^{#}	Result	Record	Site city, state
Regular Season
Tue., Dec. 9, 1952 no, no		Randolph–Macon	W 86–45	1-0	McDonough Gymnasium; Washington, DC
Sat., Dec. 13, 1952 no, no		at Loyola Maryland	W 68–66	2-0	Alumni Gymnasium; Baltimore, MD
Wed., Dec. 17, 1952 no, no		Hampden–Sydney	W 100–49	3-0	McDonough Gymnasium; Washington, DC
Mon., Dec. 29, 1952 no, no		vs. Seattle; Boston Arena Tournament	W 79–70	4-0	Boston Arena; Boston, MA
Tue., Dec. 30, 1952 no, no		vs. Rhode Island; Boston Arena Tournament	W 77–72	5-0	Boston Arena; Boston, MA
N/A no, no		George Washington	L 65–79	5-1	McDonough Gymnasium; Washington, DC
Thu., Jan. 8, 1953 no, no		at Maryland	W 54–45	6-1	Ritchie Coliseum; College Park, MD
Sat., Jan. 10, 1953 no, no		at Canisius	L 69–78	6-2	Buffalo Memorial Auditorium; Buffalo, NY
Sat., Jan. 24, 1953 no, no		at Le Moyne	W 89–67	7-2	N/A; Syracuse, NY
Wed., Jan. 28, 1953 no, no		at Siena	L 57–72	7-3	Washington Avenue Armory; Albany, NY
Tue., Feb. 3, 1953 no, no		Penn State	L 70–73	7-4	McDonough Gymnasium; Washington, DC
Sat., Feb. 7, 1953 no, no		Temple	W 72–55	8-4	McDonough Gymnasium; Washington, DC
Tue., Feb. 10, 1953 no, no		at Virginia	L 75–76	8-5	N/A; Charlottesville, VA
Sat., Feb. 14, 1953 no, no		Navy	W 81–65	9-5	McDonough Gymnasium; Washington, DC
Thu., Feb. 19, 1953 no, no		Maryland	W 49–48	10-5	McDonough Gymnasium; Washington, DC
Sat., Feb. 21, 1953 no, no		La Salle	L 68–73	10-6	McDonough Gymnasium; Washington, DC
Wed., Feb. 25, 1953 no, no		at St. Joseph's	W 73–64	11-6	Philadelphia Convention Hall; Philadelphia, PA
Sat., Feb. 28, 1954 no, no		Fordham	W 74–63	12-6	McDonough Gymnasium; Washington, DC
Tue., Mar. 3, 1953 no, no		at George Washington	W 73–64	13-6	Uline Arena; Washington, DC
National Invitation Tournament
Sat., Mar. 7, 1953 no, no		vs. Louisville; First Round	L 79–92	13-7	Madison Square Garden; New York, NY
*Non-conference game. ^{#}Rankings from AP Poll. (#) Tournament seedings in parentheses.
