= Georgetown Hoyas men's basketball =

Men's basketball team of Georgetown University

2026–27 Georgetown Hoyas men's basketball team
- University: Georgetown University
- First season: 1906–07; 120 years ago
- Athletic director: Lee Reed
- Head coach: Ed Cooley; 4th season, 42–57 (.424)
- Location: Washington, D.C.
- Arena: Capital One Arena (capacity: 20,356)
- NCAA division: Division I
- Conference: Big East
- Nickname: Hoyas
- Colors: Blue and gray
- All-time record: 1,755–1,190 (.596)
- NCAA tournament record: 47–30 (.610)

NCAA Division I tournament champions
- 1984
Other NCAA Division I tournament results
Runner-up	1943, 1982, 1985
Final Four	1943, 1982, 1984, 1985, 2007
Elite Eight	1943, 1980, 1982, 1984, 1985, 1987, 1989, 1996, 2007
Sweet Sixteen	1980, 1982, 1984, 1985, 1987, 1989, 1995, 1996, 2001, 2006, 2007
Appearances	1943, 1975, 1976, 1979, 1980, 1981, 1982, 1983, 1984, 1985, 1986, 1987, 1988, 1989, 1990, 1991, 1992, 1994, 1995, 1996, 1997, 2001, 2006, 2007, 2008, 2010, 2011, 2012, 2013, 2015, 2021

Conference tournament champions
- ECAC: 1975, 1976, 1979 Big East: 1980, 1982, 1984, 1985, 1987, 1989, 2007, 2021

Conference regular-season champions
- EIC: 1939 Big East: 1980, 1984, 1987, 1989, 1992, 2007, 2008, 2013

Conference division champions
- Big East 7: 1996, 1997

Uniforms
Home	Away	Alternate

The Georgetown Hoyas men's basketball program represents Georgetown University in NCAA Division I men's intercollegiate basketball and the Big East Conference. Georgetown has competed in men's college basketball since 1907. The current head coach of the program is Ed Cooley.

Georgetown won the national championship in 1984 and has made the Final Four on five occasions. They have won the Big East Conference tournament a record eight times, and have also won or shared the Big East regular season title ten times. They have appeared in the NCAA tournament 31 times and in the National Invitation Tournament 13 times.

CBS Sports named the Hoyas as one of the 25 most prestigious men's basketball programs in the history of the sport due to its historic success, recognizable brand, and both production and retention of stars; while many colleges cede their claim on alumni who go on to great things (at least in the public consciousness) to the NBA franchise the player called home, the article notes that greats like Patrick Ewing or Allen Iverson maintain their association with the school.

The Hoyas historically have been well regarded not only for their team success, but also for generating players that have succeeded both on and off the court, producing NBA legends such as Patrick Ewing, Dikembe Mutombo, Alonzo Mourning, and Allen Iverson, as well as United States Congressman Henry Hyde and former NFL Commissioner Paul Tagliabue. The school has produced several active NBA players, most notably Thomas Sorber and 3x Slam Dunk Contest Champion Mac McClung. Seven former Hoya players or coaches are members of the Basketball Hall of Fame.

== History ==
=== Early years (1907–1943) ===
Founded in the fall of 1906, the Georgetown men's basketball team played its first game on February 9, 1907, defeating the University of Virginia by a score of 22–11. In its first 60-some years, the program displayed only sporadic success. Until McDonough Gymnasium opened on campus for the 1950–51 season, the team changed home courts frequently, playing on campus at Ryan Gymnasium and off campus at McKinley Technology High School, Uline Arena, and the National Guard Armory, as well as playing individual home games at the University of Maryland's Ritchie Coliseum and The Catholic University of America's Brookland Gymnasium, among others. The downtown locations of these venues was also influenced by the number of Law School students who played on the team in this era. From 1918 through 1923, while on campus at Ryan Gymnasium, Georgetown managed a 52–0 home record under coach John O'Reilly. A large on-campus arena was proposed in 1927, but it was shelved during the Great Depression.

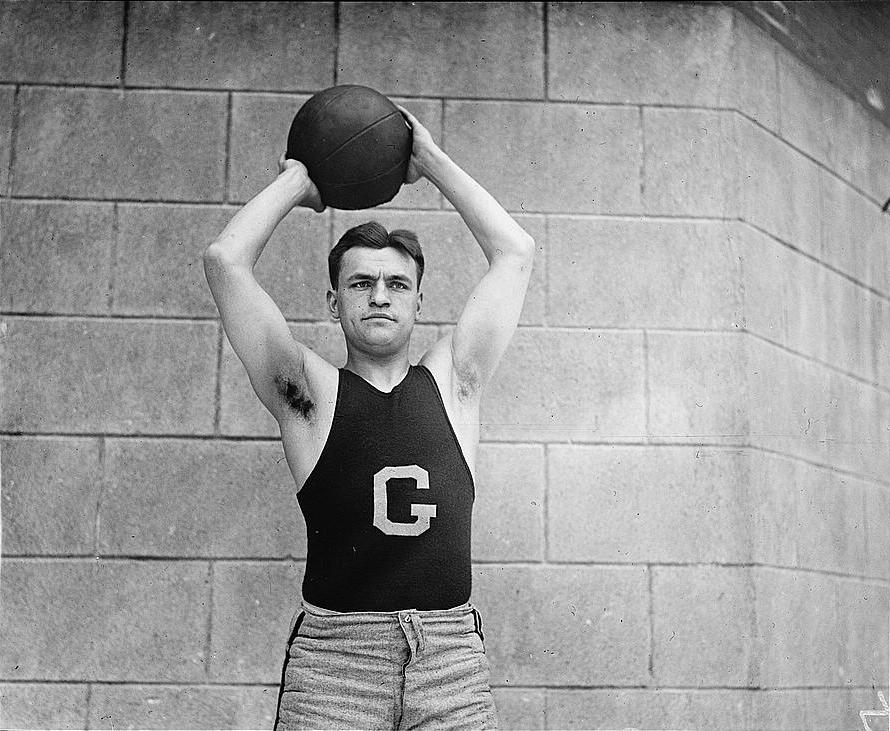
Bill Dudack was the captain of the 1919–20 team, and returned to coach the 1929–30 team.

The team recruited its first All-American, Ed Hargaden, in 1931. From 1932 until 1939, the Hoyas played in the Eastern Intercollegiate Conference, and they were regular-season conference co-champions in 1939. In 1942, a Hoya went pro for the first time, when three seniors, Al Lujack, Buddy O'Grady, and Dino Martin, were drafted professionally upon graduation.

The next year the team, led by future congressman Henry Hyde, reached new heights and posted its first 20-win season ever, going 22–5 on the year. This success translated into a berth into the 1943 NCAA tournament, the school's first postseason appearance. Taking advantage of the opportunity, the Hoyas made it all the way to the National Championship game, where they ultimately lost to Wyoming. Georgetown's coach of this squad, Elmer Ripley, was later inducted into the Basketball Hall of Fame in 1973.

=== World War II and the lean years (1943–1972) ===
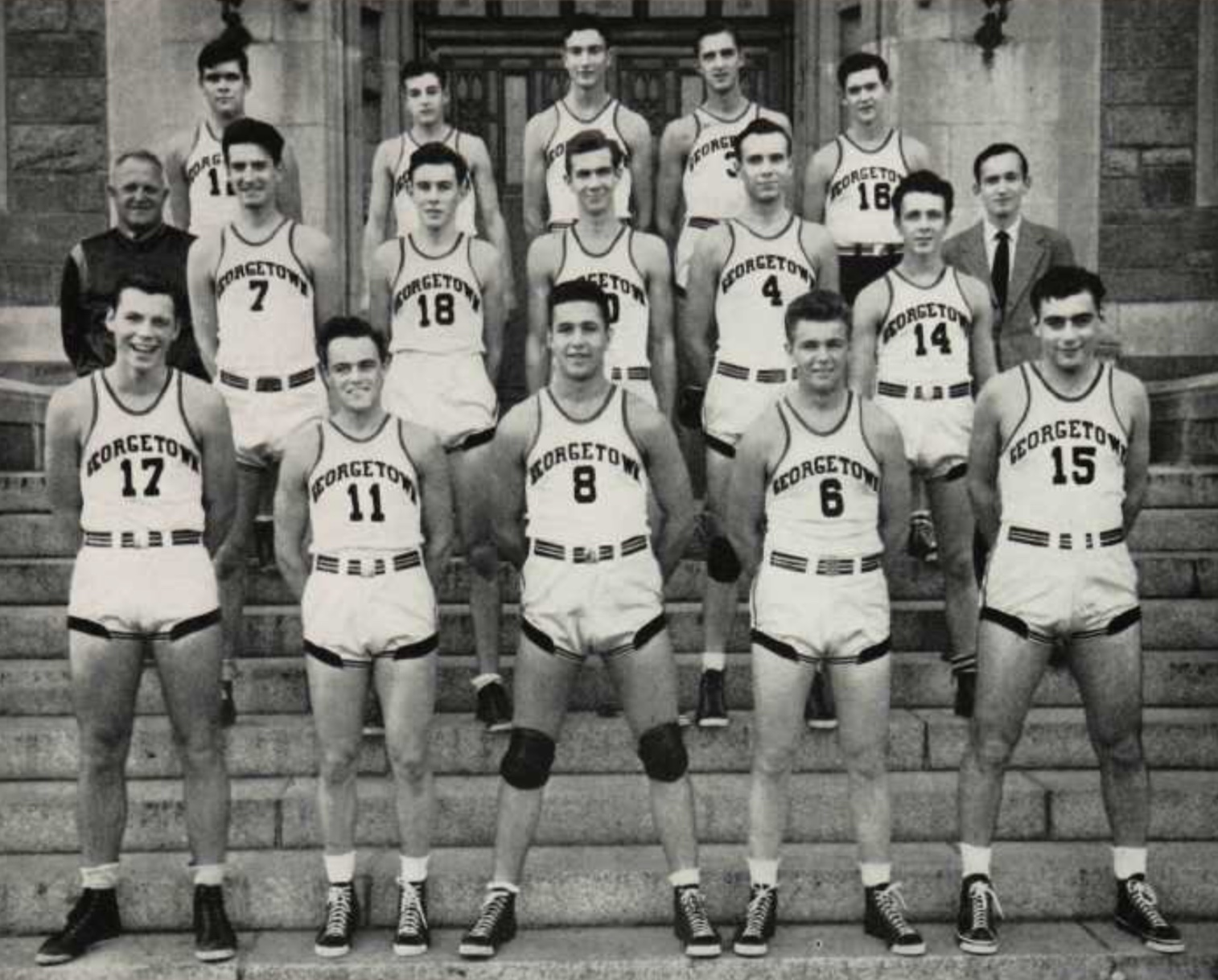
The 1942–43 team went 22–5 and reached the NCAA finals, but Georgetown suspended its athletic programs for the following two seasons because of World War II.

Coming off of the best season in school history, momentum was stalled as the program was suspended from 1943 to 1945 because of World War II. Following the hiatus the program struggled to find its footing, and it was rarely successful over the next three decades, only making two postseason appearances during this time period.

In 1953, former Baltimore Bullets player Buddy Jeannette coached the team to its first National Invitation Tournament invitation, but the team lost in the first round to Louisville. Top players from this period include Tom O'Keefe, the first Hoya to reach 1,000 career points in 1949–50, and future National Football League Commissioner Paul Tagliabue, who graduated second in Hoya career rebounds in 1962. O'Keefe returned to coach the team from 1960 until 1966. In 1966 the school hired John "Jack" Magee, who had led Boston College as a player to its first NCAA Tournament bid. Magee had some relative success early on, having several winning seasons behind Guard Jim Barry, Forward Richard Manewal and Center Paul Favorite that were capped off with an invite to the 1970 NIT, just its third post-season appearance ever. However, the team lost to LSU in the first round. A losing season the subsequent year, followed up with a three-win season in 1971–72, the worst in school history, ultimately led to his dismissal. This was the last time a Hoyas head coach suffered back-to-back losing seasons for over 35 years.

=== John Thompson Jr. era (1972–1999) ===
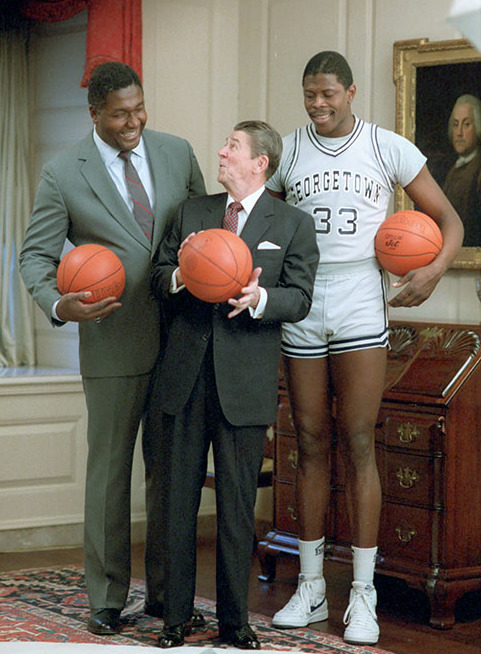
Coach John Thompson Jr. and Patrick Ewing meet with Ronald Reagan after winning the 1984 National Championship.

John Thompson Jr., played two seasons with the Boston Celtics before he achieved local notability coaching St. Anthony's High School in Washington, D.C. to several very successful seasons. Thompson was hired to coach Georgetown in 1972, and with recruits from St. Anthony's like Merlin Wilson, quickly and dramatically improved the team. Georgetown, while still independent, participated in the Eastern College Athletic Conference′s 1975 postseason ECAC South tournament, and after a 16–9 regular season found itself facing West Virginia in the conference tournament championship. Derrick Jackson's buzzer beater won Georgetown its first tournament championship, and a bid to the 1975 NCAA tournament. Georgetown repeated as ECAC South tournament champions the following year, beating George Washington University when Craig Esherick's buzzer beater sent the game to overtime, and as ECAC South-Upstate Tournament champions in the 1978-79 season, beating Syracuse University in Jim Boeheim's first game against the Hoyas as Syracuse's coach.

==== 1979-80 Season: birth of a historic rivalry and champions of the inaugural Big East regular season and tournament ====
Prior to the 1979–80 season, Georgetown joined with six other schools, Providence, St. John's, Syracuse, Seton Hall, Connecticut, and Boston College to found a conference focused primarily on basketball. The Big East Conference provided Georgetown increased competition, and several of its longest rivalries. For example, prior to the formation of the Big East, Georgetown had only played national powerhouse Syracuse 18 times in the previous 51 years, and only twice in the prior decade. After the start of the Big East, they played Syracuse 27 times in the next 10 years.

On February 13, 1980, Syracuse had won 57 straight games on its home court of Manley Field House: the longest winning streak in Division 1 basketball. The team was about to move to the new Carrier Dome. Its last game of the Big East regular season and its final ever at Manley was supposed to be a celebration of the winning streak and the school's success. With Syracuse ranked #2 in the country and almost invincible at Manley, they were expected to readily beat Georgetown. Syracuse seniors had never lost a home game in their entire careers. Hoyas radio announcer Rich Chvotkin said, "Everybody was pointing to Syracuse continuing that streak, and closing Manley Field House on a high note." Years later, Thompson said in the lead-up to the game, he was extremely nervous because of how crazy the crowd would be: “My nerves were at the height at that point saying: ‘What the hell am I doing closing this place? The place is going to be, you know, going mad.’”

Behind by 14 points at the half, and by many points late in the game, Georgetown mounted a surprise, rapid comeback. After Georgetown star Sleepy Floyd scored two last-second free-throws to win, Coach Thompson grabbed a microphone and declared "Manley Field House is officially closed" to an audience of stunned, silent Syracuse supporters. ESPN columnist Eamonn Brennan, wrote that Manley Field House “is most famous for its service to the Georgetown-Syracuse blood feud.” He said: “Before 1980, the Hoyas and Orange were competitors, and little more. When John Thompson delivered his famous 'Manley Field House is officially closed,' he managed to pack so much ether into six words that a rivalry was born on the spot. It's been that way ever since."

Syracuse professor Lawrence Mason said, "There was no rivalry at all until that Manley Field House game." Chvotkin agreed: "I think the rest of that Georgetown-Cuse rivalry was predicated on closing Manley Field House." Doug Logan, the Syracuse radio announcer for 24 years, said: "It was Syracuse and Georgetown and that hated, bitter rivalry that made the Big East a national phenomenon." ESPN analyst and Syracuse graduate Mike Tirico commented: "Without John’s larger than life personality, his great players, his steadfastness in the John Thompson way of doing things, it wouldn’t have built the rivalry and wouldn't have built the Big East to what it became for the 80s and the 90s."

The Manley upset also made Georgetown co-champions of the first Big East regular season. Three weeks later, Georgetown faced Syracuse again in the finals of the first Big East tournament. With Syracuse ranked #3 in the country and Georgetown #20, the Hoyas were again the underdogs. But they pulled off another upset, winning 87–81 behind 21 points from Floyd to become the first Big East tournament champions. In the 1980 NCAA tournament, the team advanced to the Elite Eight, where they fell to the Iowa Hawkeyes on a last second foul call.

==== 1981-82 Season ====
The team moved its home arena in the 1981-82 season to the Capital Centre in Landover, Maryland, to accommodate its growing fan base. It also marked the arrival of heralded recruit, Patrick Ewing, who became one of the first college players to start and star on a varsity team as a freshman. That year, Ewing led the Hoyas to their second Big East tournament title in school history, and a No. 1 seed in the NCAA tournament.

In the tournament, the Hoyas advanced to their first Final Four since 1943, where they defeated the University of Louisville 50–46, to set up a showdown in the NCAA Final against the University of North Carolina. In one of the most star-studded championship games in NCAA history, Ewing was called for goaltending five times in the first half (later revealed to be intentional at the behest of coach Thompson), setting the tone for the Hoyas and making his presence felt. The Hoyas led by one point late in the game, but a jumpshot by future NBA superstar Michael Jordan gave North Carolina the lead. Georgetown still had a chance at winning the game in the final seconds, but Freddy Brown mistakenly threw a bad pass directly to opposing player James Worthy, and North Carolina won 63–62.

==== 1982-83 Season ====
For the 1982-83 season, Georgetown began the season as the No. 2 ranked team in the country. The early season included a highly anticipated matchup with No. 1 Virginia, and highly regarded center Ralph Sampson. Arenas nationwide jockeyed to host the matchup but Georgetown insisted on hosting it at the Capital Centre. WTBS won the rights to broadcast the game with a $550,000 bid, and it was billed as the "Game of the Decade". It became the first major college sports event telecasted exclusively on cable television. In the game, held on December 11, 1982, Virginia's veteran team won, 68–63.

The Hoyas went on to post a 22–10 record for the season and made another NCAA Tournament appearance, but were defeated in the second round of the tournament by Memphis State. This was the only season in Ewing's four-year Georgetown career where the team did not make it as least as far as the National Championship game.

==== 1983-84 Season: National Champions ====
In the 1983-84 season Georgetown again won the Big East conference regular season title, and faced Syracuse for the Big East tournament championship. In a physical and tightly contested contest, Georgetown won 82–71 in overtime, securing their third tournament title in the first five years of the newly formed conference.

In the NCAA tournament, the No. 1 seeded Hoyas ultimately advanced to the Final Four for the third time in school history to face Kentucky, a team which had never lost a national semifinal game and was led by the "Twin Towers," Sam Bowie and Melvin Turpin. Georgetown was able to turn an early 12 point deficit into a 53–40 win to advance to the National Championship game. In the final, the Hoyas faced the University of Houston and future Hall of Fame center Hakeem Olajuwon, who were making their second straight National Championship game appearance. Georgetown led comfortably throughout the final, and went on to an 84–75 victory, giving the school its first NCAA Championship. Ewing was named the tournament's Most Outstanding Player, while Thompson became the first African-American coach to win an NCAA Division I title. Freddy Brown, who made the key turnover in the title game two years prior, was given the chance to raise the trophy first.

==== 1984-85 Season ====
To begin the 1984-85 season, the defending champions opened the season as the No. 1 ranked team and won their first 18 games. On January 26, 1985, St. John's University snapped the Hoyas' 29 game win streak (dating back to the prior season), in what was the first of an unprecedented four contests this season. Their next meeting on February 27, 1985, was one of the most anticipated games in college basketball history, with Georgetown and St. John's ranked No. 2 and No. 1 respectively. Coach Thompson entered Madison Square Garden wearing a shirt under his blazer in the same sweater pattern as St. John's coach Lou Carnesecca, and as a result the game became known as "the sweater game." The Hoyas easily won the game 85–69, and then defeated the Redmen again just a few weeks later in the 1985 Big East tournament finals, capturing their fourth title in six years. The teams met one more time, after both advanced to the Final Four in the NCAA tournament. Again No. 1 Georgetown was victorious, easily handling St. John's 77–59.

In the title game the Hoyas found themselves matched up with another conference rival in Villanova, whom they had beaten twice that season. An overwhelming favorite going into the game, Georgetown was upset by the Wildcats 66–64, who shot a record 78.6 percent (22 of 28) from the floor, denying Georgetown back-to-back titles. Ewing graduated, having helped his team to a 121–23 record in his four years, and was the first player in school history to be drafted with the first overall pick.

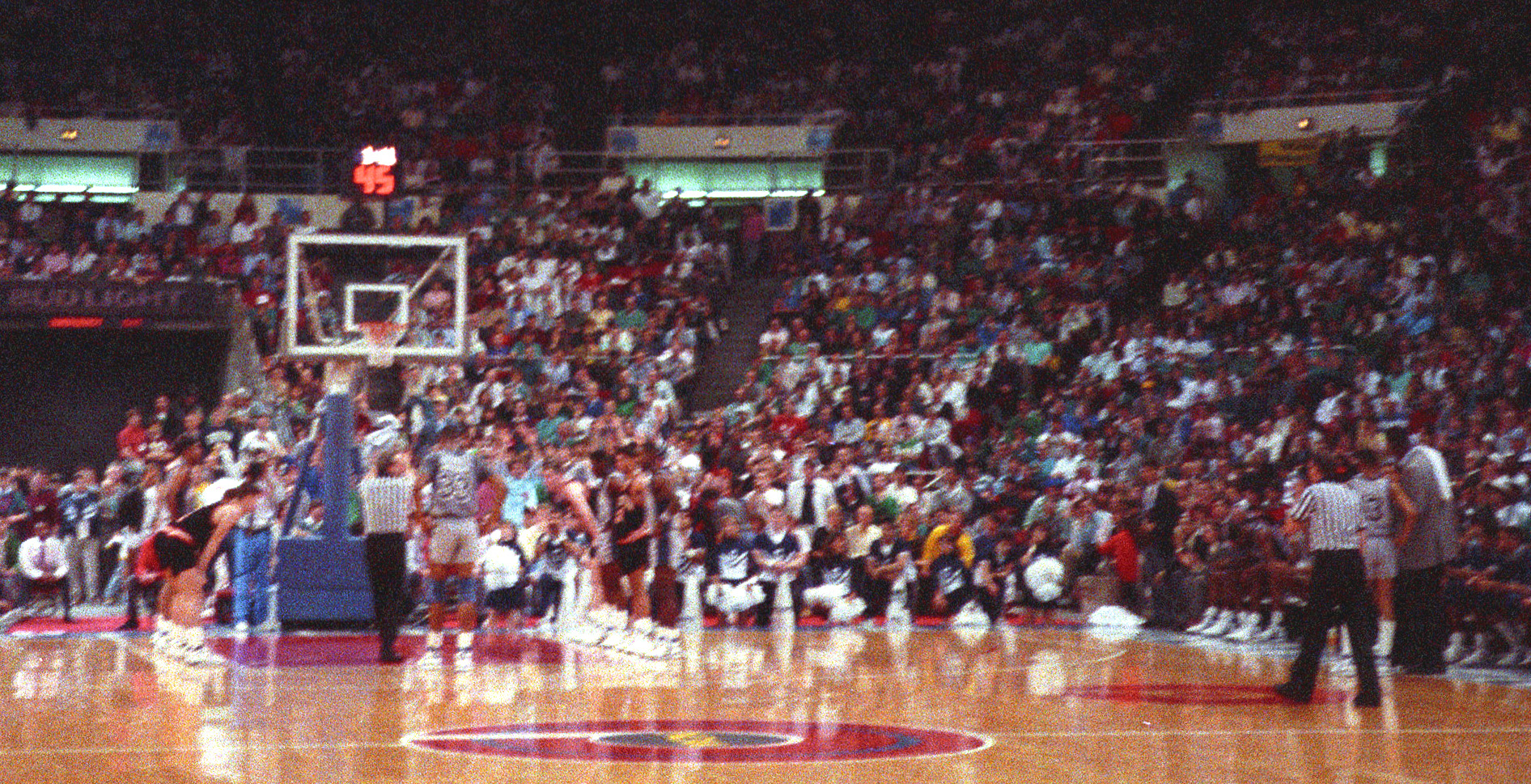
Georgetown playing Princeton in the first round of the 1989 NCAA tournament

==== Continued Success Under Coach Thompson ====
Following the enormous heights of Ewing's four-year run, the program continued its success in the years that followed. Senior Reggie Williams led the Hoyas to both Big East regular season and tournament championships in the 1986–87 season. Freshman Alonzo Mourning and sophomore Dikembe Mutombo helped win both titles in the 1988–89 season. Mourning and Mutombo were both excellent shot blockers; Mourning led the nation in 1988–89, and fans created a "Rejection Row" section under the basket. They repeated both championships in the 1989–90 season and won the regular season title in the 1991-92 season.

In the 1994–95 season, newcomer Allen Iverson won the Big East Rookie of the Year award. During his two years at Georgetown, Iverson scored a Georgetown-record 22.9 points per game. In 1995–96, he propelled the Hoyas to a major upset over the Connecticut Huskies during the season, but Georgetown later lost to the Huskies in the final seconds of that year's Big East tournament. In the NCAA tournament, the Hoyas came up one game short of the Final Four, losing to the University of Massachusetts, the top ranked team in the country.

In the 1996–97 season, with an 11–7 conference record, the Hoyas won the regular season Big East 7 Division title for the second year in a row, but fell in the first round of the 1997 NCAA tournament. In December 1997, just after the beginning of the 1997-98 season, the team moved back into Washington, D.C., with the construction of a new arena, the Verizon Center (originally MCI Center), in Chinatown. The 1997-98 campaign ended in an overtime loss to Georgia Tech in the NIT.

Thompson retired abruptly in the midst of the 1998–99 season on January 8, 1999, citing marital problems, and was replaced by his assistant Craig Esherick. Under Thompson, 26 players were chosen in the NBA draft, eight in the first round, including two players selected first overall; Ewing by the New York Knicks in 1985 and Iverson by the Philadelphia 76ers in 1996. Over his 26 1/2 seasons, Thompson's Hoyas went an impressive 596–239 (.714), running off a streak of 24 postseason appearances with 20 in the NCAA tournament and four in the NIT. He was honored as the National Coach of the Year three times during his career at Georgetown, and was inducted into the Basketball Hall of Fame in 1999.

=== Craig Esherick era (1999–2004) ===
Craig Esherick coached the Georgetown Hoyas basketball squad from January 1999 to March 2004. Esherick was a four-year player for the men's basketball team from 1974 to 1978 and then the lead assistant coach under John Thompson Jr. from 1981 to 1999. The team finished with a 15–15 record in his first season – going 8–10 after Thompson resigned and Esherick took over –before losing to Princeton in the first round of the 1999 NIT. They improved in 1999-2000, going 19–15 and accepting an invitation to the 2000 NIT. After winning the first-round game in triple overtime over Virginia, the Hoyas lost in the second-round game to California.

==== 2000-01 Season ====
In 2000–01, led by future top NBA Draft pick Michael Sweetney, they made the NCAA tournament after finishing 23–7 in the regular season. In the opening round of the NCAA tournament the 7th-seeded Hoyas advanced past 10th-seeded Arkansas on a game-winning shot at the buzzer by Nat Burton. The Hoyas subsequently beat Hampton, and then lost to third-seeded Maryland in the Sweet Sixteen.

==== Esherick's Final Years ====
In 2001–02, the Hoyas went 19–11, barely missing an NCAA tournament bid. The team rejected a bid to the 2002 NIT bid because of travel-arrangement issues associated with the players' ability to attend classes, resulting in their first season without a postseason tournament since 1973-74. In 2002-03, the Hoyas finished the regular season with a 19–15 record, and accepted a bid to the 2003 NIT, where they made it to the final but lost to Big East rival St. John's. Sweetney was named a second-team All-American and was drafted with the ninth pick in the 2002 NBA draft by the New York Knicks.

In Esherick's final season, 2003–04, the Hoyas struggled to a 13–15 overall record and a dismal 4–12 Big East record, and for the first time since the 1973–74 season received no invitation to either the NCAA tournament or the NIT. The 13 wins were the team's fewest since the 1973–74 season and Esherick was fired after 5 1/2 seasons as head coach on March 15, 2004, five days after an opening-round loss in the Big East tournament to Boston College. He had posted a 103–74 (.597) record during his tenure as head coach. Georgetown began a national search for a new coach after Esherick's firing that resulted in the hiring of John Thompson III.

=== John Thompson III era (2004–2017) ===
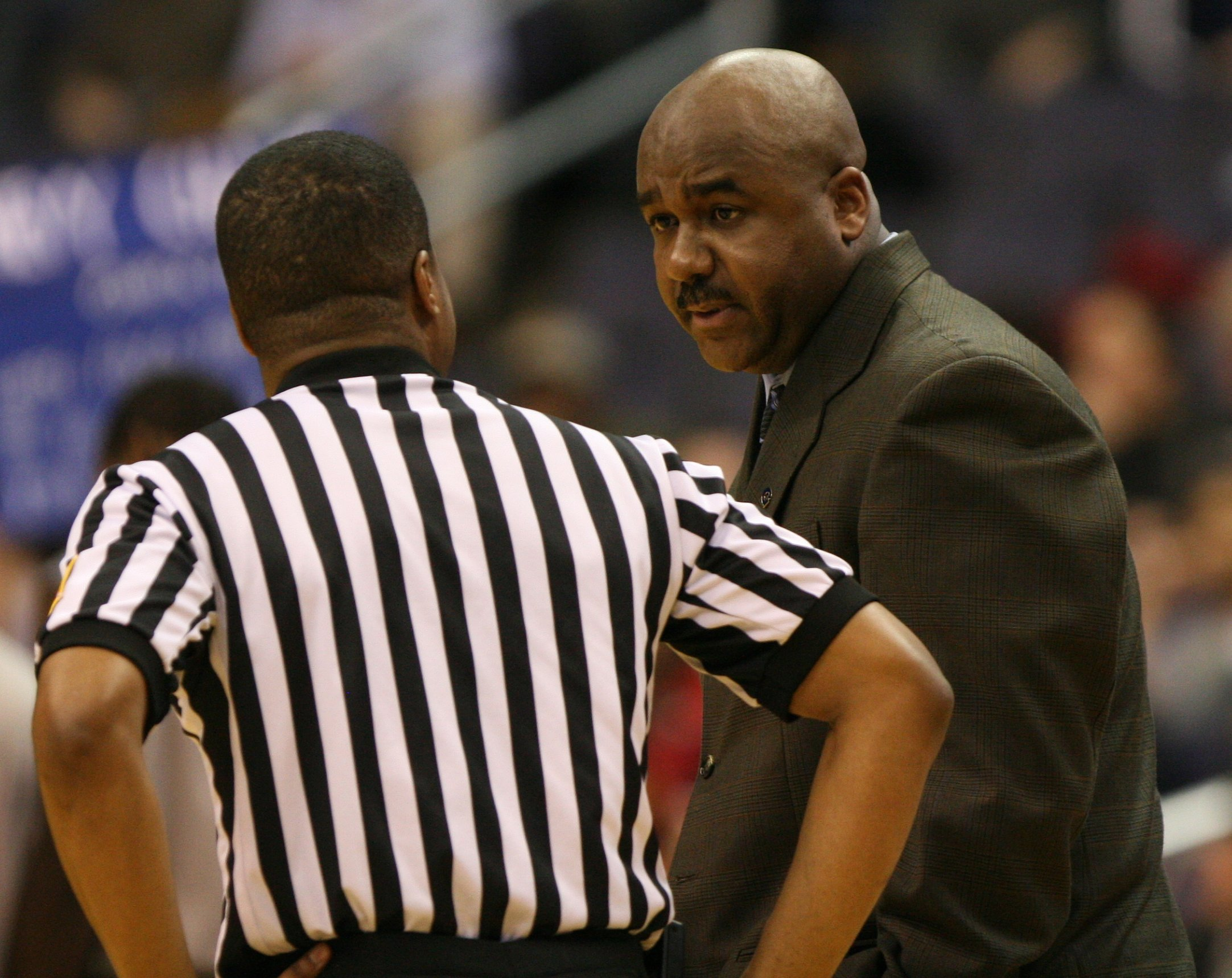
John Thompson III took over coaching duties in April 2004.

On April 21, 2004, John Thompson III was selected as the head coach of the Hoyas. The son of the legendary Hoyas coach took over the position after over a decade at Princeton University. The younger Thompson was a player for the Tigers from 1984 to 1988, was an assistant coach at Princeton from 1995 to 2000, and then took over as head coach at Princeton until his move to the Hoyas. Thompson's head coaching stint at Princeton was marked with success as he led the Tigers to three Ivy League titles, two NCAA Tournament appearances and one NIT appearance.

Thompson brought with him an adaptation of the Princeton offense as an offensive philosophy to Georgetown. He had learned it under the tutelage of legendary coach Pete Carril at Princeton and began to adjust the strategy to the more athletic players he would be coaching at Georgetown. Thompson III also immediately brought two new assistant coaches to Georgetown in Robert Burke and Kevin Broadus.

Thompson inherited four players that Esherick had recruited: Jeff Green, Roy Hibbert, Tyler Crawford and RaMell Ross. He also brought with him a former Princeton recruit, Jonathan Wallace and saw the return of two major contributors from the previous Georgetown team in Brandon Bowman, Ashanti Cook, and Darrel Owens. John Thompson III's first notable win with the team took place on January 21, 2006, in the 16th game of the 2005–06 season, when unranked Georgetown upset No. 1 Duke. This was Georgetown's first win over a No. 1 ranked team in 21 years.

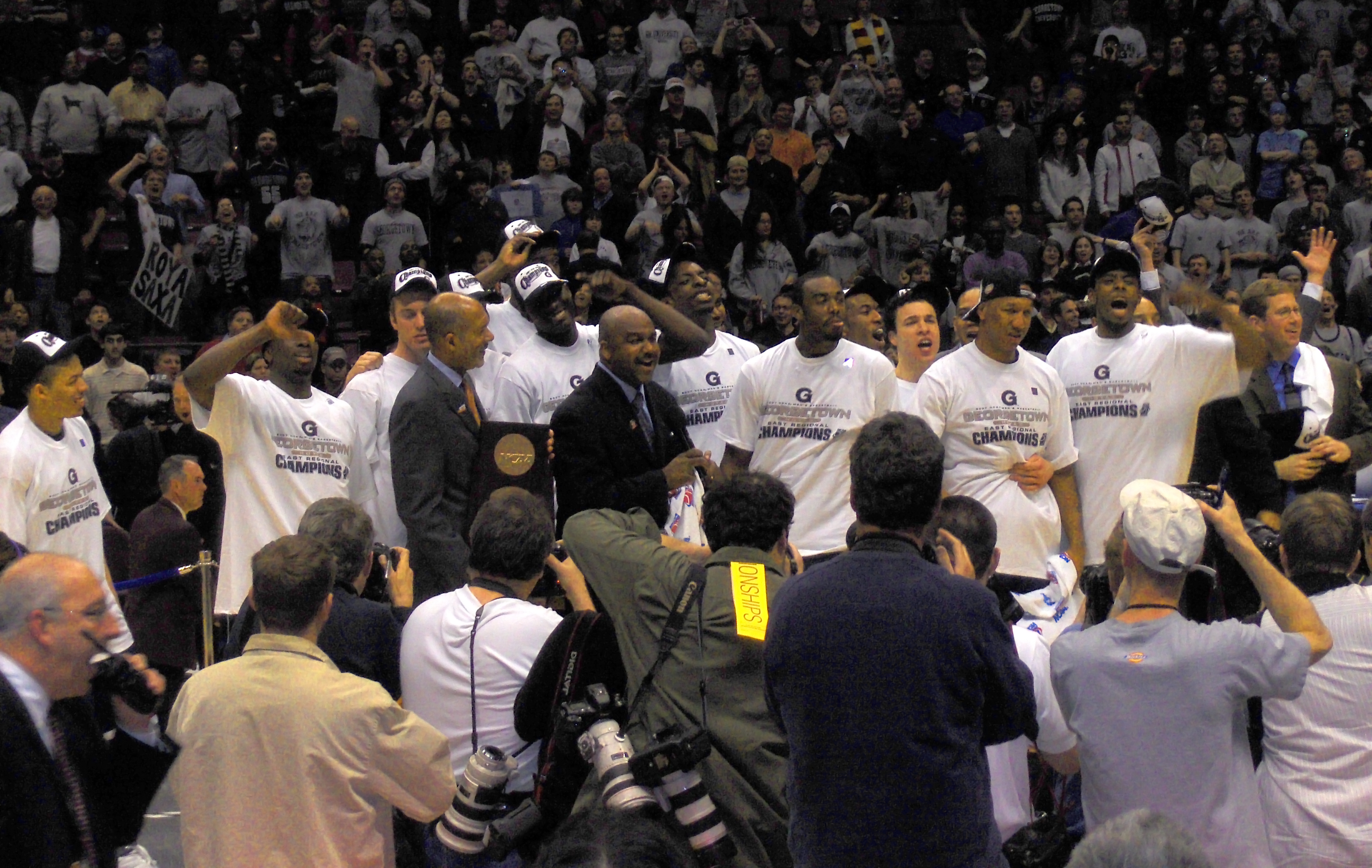
The 2006–07 team being presented with the trophy for the East Region Championship in the 2007 NCAA tournament.

==== 2006-07 Season ====
The 2006–07 season marked the centennial of Hoya hoops, which was celebrated by honoring some of the team's most famous alumni at the Georgetown-Marquette game on February 10, 2007. Led by juniors Green, Hibbert, Wallace, Patrick Ewing Jr., the son of the Georgetown player from the elder Thompson era, the Hoyas won their first regular-season Big East Championship since 1992 and defeated Pittsburgh to win their first Big East tournament championship since 1989. Jeff Green was named the Big East Player of the Year and the tournament's Most Outstanding Player. In the NCAA tournament, the Hoyas beat North Carolina in the Regional Final when their defense caused North Carolina to suffer an improbable collapse in which UNC missed 22 of their final 23 field goal attempts. The Hoyas then advanced to the Final Four where they fell to an Ohio State team led by Greg Oden.

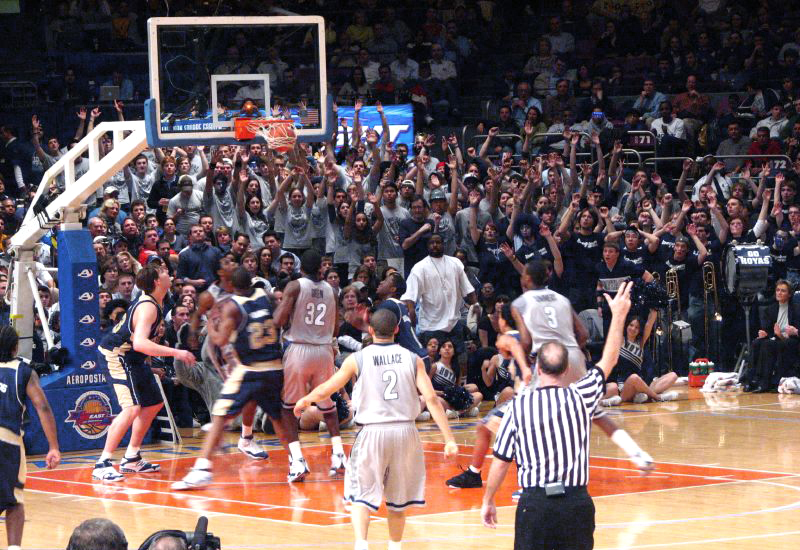
Georgetown faced the Pittsburgh Panthers in the Big East tournament final in 2007 and 2008.

==== 2007-08 Season ====
The 2007–08 Hoyas finished with a regular season record of 27–5, and again won the conference regular season title. They lost to Pittsburgh in the Big East tournament championship game. They received a No. 2 seed in the NCAA tournament, where they lost their second-round game. After the season, Roy Hibbert, Jonathan Wallace, and Patrick Ewing Jr. all graduated, while Vernon Macklin and Jeremiah Rivers both transferred from the school.

==== 2008-09 Season ====
The Hoyas began their 2008–09 season ranked No. 22 AP/No. 18 Coaches, however, college basketball's toughest strength of schedule eventually wore down a team that was also one of the youngest. The Hoyas were 7–11 in Big East play for a 12th-place finish, followed by a first-round loss in the Big East tournament. The Hoyas accepted a bid to the NIT, but lost in the first round to Baylor.

==== 2009-10 Season ====
In 2009–10, the team finished the season 23–11, and 10–8 in Big East play. They advanced to the championship game of the Big East tournament before losing to West Virginia. They received an at–large bid to the NCAA tournament, earning a No. 3 seed in the Midwest Region, where they were upset by No. 14 seed Ohio in the first round. Standout center Greg Monroe entered the NBA draft as a sophomore and was selected by the Detroit Pistons.

==== 2010-11 Season ====
The 2010–11 team was led by Austin Freeman and Chris Wright. The team scored multiple early wins over ranked teams, including an overtime win at No. 9 Missouri, but their stumbles at the end of the season coincided with Wright breaking his hand and missing three games. The team received an at-large bid as a No. 6 seed, but lost in their first game of the NCAA tournament to No. 11-seeded and eventual Final Four participant VCU.

==== 2011-12 Season ====
Prior to the 2011–12 season, the Hoyas made a goodwill trip to China for several matches with local teams. U.S. Vice President Joe Biden attended their first game, a win over the Shanxi Zhongyu Brave Dragons. Their second game against the Bayi Rockets, however, ended in a brawl, causing the team to leave the court while Chinese fans threw garbage and debris. Georgetown won its final games, against the Liaoning Dinosaurs and the Taiwanese national team without incident. The Hoyas finished the season in fourth place in the Big East and received a bid to the NCAA tournament as a No. 3 seed in the Midwest. After a win in the second round, they were upset by No. 11-seeded NC State.

==== 2012-13 Season ====
The 2012–13 season saw the Hoyas as the top overall seed in the Big East tournament based on a tiebreaker, but lost in the semifinals. Georgetown received a bid as a No. 2 seed in the South bracket in the NCAA tournament, facing tournament newcomer Florida Gulf Coast University in the second round. Georgetown lost to the 15th-seeded Eagles 78–68, the seventh number two seed to lose to a 15 seed. It was the fourth consecutive season the Hoyas were eliminated by a double-digit seed in the NCAA tournament.

==== 2013-14 Season ====
The 2013–14 season was the team's first after Georgetown and six other schools left the original Big East Conference and joined Butler, Creighton, and Xavier in forming the new Big East Conference – part of a major conference realignment in which several other teams moved to the Atlantic Coast Conference from the old Big East and the old Big East became the American Athletic Conference.

Like the previous year, the 2013–14 season started abroad, with the Hoyas playing in the Armed Forces Classic at Camp Humphreys near Pyeongtaek, South Korea. After a 17–13 regular-season record followed by an upset in the first round of the Big East tournament at the hands of last-place DePaul, the team received a No. 4 seed in the NIT, losing in the second round to top-seeded Florida State.

==== John Thompson III's Final Years ====
In 2014–15, the Hoyas rebounded from their previous season's performance. Ranked as high as No. 21 at times, they completed the regular season with a 20–7 record and a second-place finish in the Big East, and advanced to the semifinals of the Big East tournament before losing to Xavier. Ranked No. 22 in the country, they received a No. 4 seed in the NCAA tournament, but lost to Utah in the third round.

The Hoyas under Thompson III struggled for the next two years. They began their 2015–16 season with a four-game exhibition trip to Italy and Switzerland, and early in the regular season defeated No. 14 Syracuse, but then staggered to a 15–18 finish. They failed to receive an invitation to either the NCAA tournament or the NIT for the first time since 2004 and only the second time since 1974.

During the 2016–17 season, Georgetown defeated three ranked teams—No. 13 Oregon, No. 16 Creighton, and No. 11 Butler—as well as their former Big East rivals Syracuse and Connecticut, but they finished ninth in the Big East with a 5–13 conference record—the most losses they had ever suffered in a season in either version of the Big East Conference—and lost to St. John's in the first round of the 2017 Big East tournament to finish 14–18. They missed both the NCAA tournament and the NIT for the second straight year, the first time they had missed the postseason in back-to-back seasons since 1974.

Thompson became the first Georgetown head coach to preside over consecutive losing seasons since John "Jack" Magee in 1970–71 and 1971–72. On March 23, 2017, Georgetown officials announced that Thompson had been fired.

=== Patrick Ewing era (2017–2023) ===
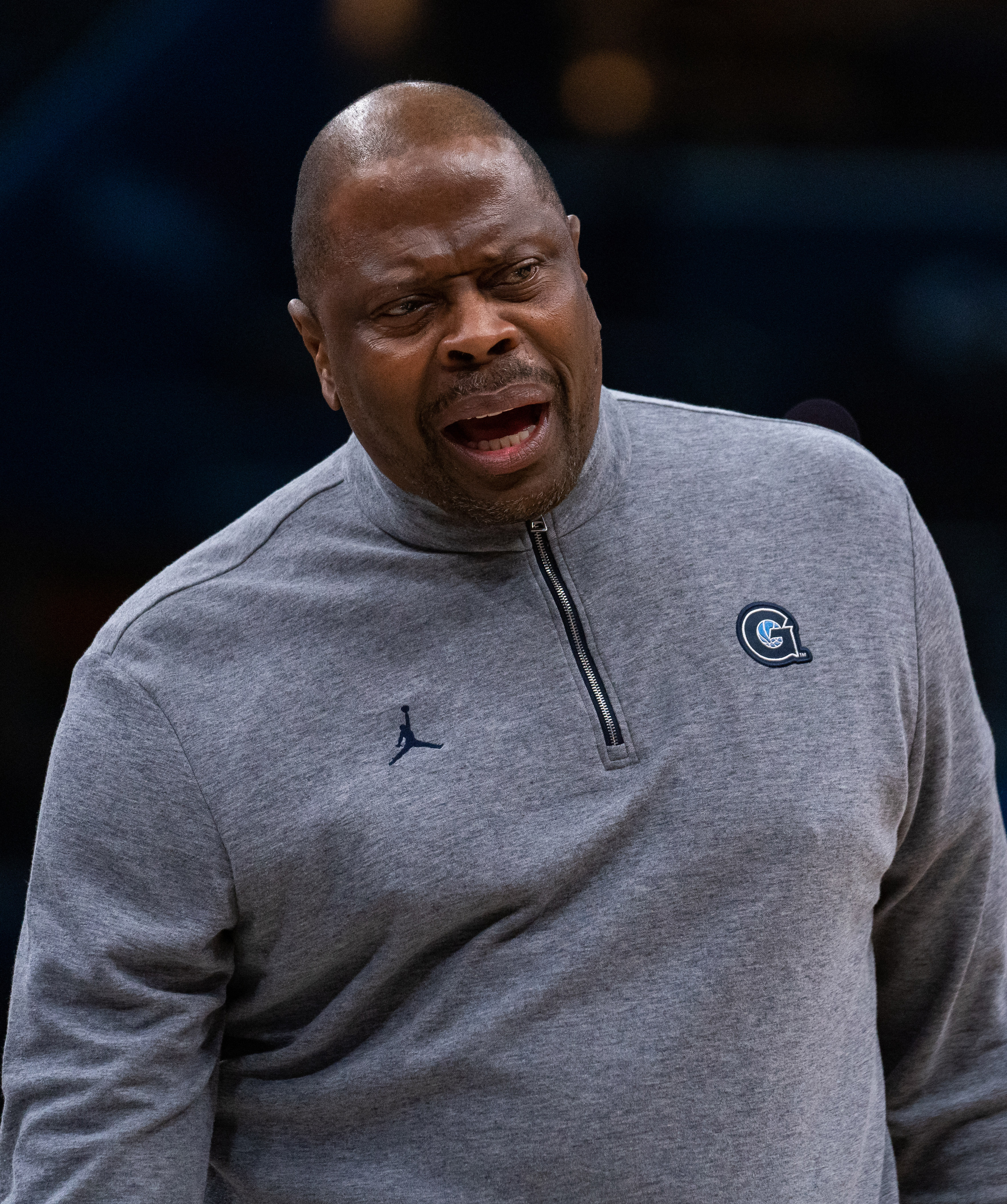
Patrick Ewing returned to Georgetown as head coach in 2017.

On April 3, 2017, Georgetown University announced that it had hired Patrick Ewing, who stands alongside Allen Iverson as arguably the school's most decorated player, as its head coach. In his four years as a player at Georgetown, Ewing led the Hoyas to three Big East championships, three Final Fours, and the 1984 National Championship on his way to become the #1 pick in the NBA draft. Prior to taking over as the program's head coach, Ewing had spent the previous thirteen years as an assistant coach in the NBA, working for four different franchises under the tutelage of coaches such as Pat Riley, Jeff Van Gundy, Stan Van Gundy, and Steve Clifford.

==== 2017-18 Season ====
In 2017–18, Georgetown finished with a 15–15 record and 5–13 in the Big East. The Hoyas won the first eight games of Ewing's tenure and finished their non-conference schedule with a 10–1 record, but struggled in conference play. The season ended with a 88–77 loss to St. John's in the first round of the Big East tournament. The team did not participate in any postseason tournament. One bright spot, however, was the play of freshman Jamorko Pickett, who was unanimously named to the Big East All-freshman team.

==== 2018-19 Season ====
In Ewing's second season, the 2018–19 team finished 19–12 and 9–9 in the Big East, in a four-way tie for third place in the conference, their highest finish since 2015. At the conclusion of the conference schedule, Jesse Govan was named First Team All-Big East, James Akinjo was named Big East Freshman of the Year, and Mac McClung and Josh LeBlanc were named to the All-Big East Freshman Team. The Hoyas lost their first game in the 2019 Big East tournament to Seton Hall 73–57. They were selected to play in the 2019 NIT, their first postseason appearance since 2015, but dropped their first-round game 71–68 to Harvard.

==== 2019-20 Season ====
The following season the 2019–20 Hoyas finished 15–17 and 5–13 in the Big East. In November, the team participated in the Empire Classic at Madison Square Garden in New York City where they beat No. 22 Texas 82–66 and moved to the final to face No. 1 Duke. Despite having a double-digit lead in the first half vs Duke, the Hoyas ultimately fell 81–73. Playing with only 9 scholarship players following several defections and injuries, the Hoyas lost their final 7 games, including a 75–62 loss in the opening round of the 2020 Big East tournament to St. John's. All postseason tournaments were subsequently cancelled due to the COVID-19 pandemic.

==== 2020-21 Season ====
The 2020–21 Hoyas finished the season 10–13 and 7–9 in the Big East. Before the season started, leading scorer Mac McClung announced his decision to transfer to Texas Tech. Because of COVID-19 protocols, the team played all of its home games on campus at McDonough Arena without fans. After a 74–69 loss at Syracuse, the team went on a 21-day pause due to COVID-19 protocols. After the hiatus, the team returned to win six of its next ten games. The Hoyas' 7–9 record resulted in an eighth-place finish in the conference. At the 2021 Big East tournament, the team won its first tournament game under Ewing, with a 68–49 victory over Marquette in the opening round, then followed that up with wins against top-seeded Villanova and Seton Hall, sending them to the title game where they defeated Creighton 73–48 for their first title since 2007, and the eighth in school history, extending their own conference record. The Hoyas earned a 12 seed in the NCAA tournament, where they lost their opening round game to Colorado 96–73.

==== Ewing's Final Years as Coach: Historic Struggles ====
The following season, the Hoyas were unable to build off their unlikely March run the prior season and suffered their worst season in school history. Georgetown lost all 19 conference games they played in 2021-22. They also set a school record for most losses in a season with 25, finishing the year at 6–25. The season ended with a 57–53 loss in the 2022 Big East tournament to Seton Hall. Despite some rumblings about his job security, Ewing was retained by the university for the following season.

Despite high hopes for a team led by 5-star freshman Aminu Mohammed and several highly-touted transfers, the 2022–23 Hoyas failed to improve from the prior year's low. The team would lose its first 9 conference games, extending the record of consecutive conference game losses to 29, until they eventually beat DePaul 81–76 on January 24, at Capital One Arena. The Hoyas would only win more game after this point and finished the year at 7–25, matching the program's high water mark for losses, just set the previous season. The team lost in the 2023 Big East tournament 48–80 to Villanova.

The following day, the university announced that Ewing would not return as coach, ending his six-year run at his alma mater. His Georgetown coaching career ended with a record of 75–109 (.408) and 28–81 (.257) in the Big East; both are the lowest winning percentages for a coach in the modern era of the program. Much of the relative failure of the Ewing era can be attributed to the coach’s outdated recruiting ideology. Ewing had a penchant for recruiting international players, specifically centers. This strategy can yield excellent results, such as when Ewing himself was signed out of Jamaica, and Michael Olowokandi, who (regardless of how his NBA career turned out) was a game changer as a walk on at Pacific. However, this strategy has inherent risks, and the Hoyas ended up holding the bag on players such as Qudus Wahab. Additionally, Ewing prioritised acquiring the top 4-5 star freshmen rather than developing depth, and thus wound up with rosters with considerable high-end talent but questionable depth. As a result of this policy, as well as some strategic ineptitude, the Hoyas would send several players to the NBA but never find sustained success. The most egregious example may be the 2018-2019 and 2019-2020 seasons, where over which span the Hoyas sent 5 players to the NBA; Omer Yurtseven, Mac McClung, James Akinjo, Myron Gardner, and Jamorko Pickett. Over the same span, the Hoyas went 14-22 in the Big East.

=== Ed Cooley era (2023–present) ===
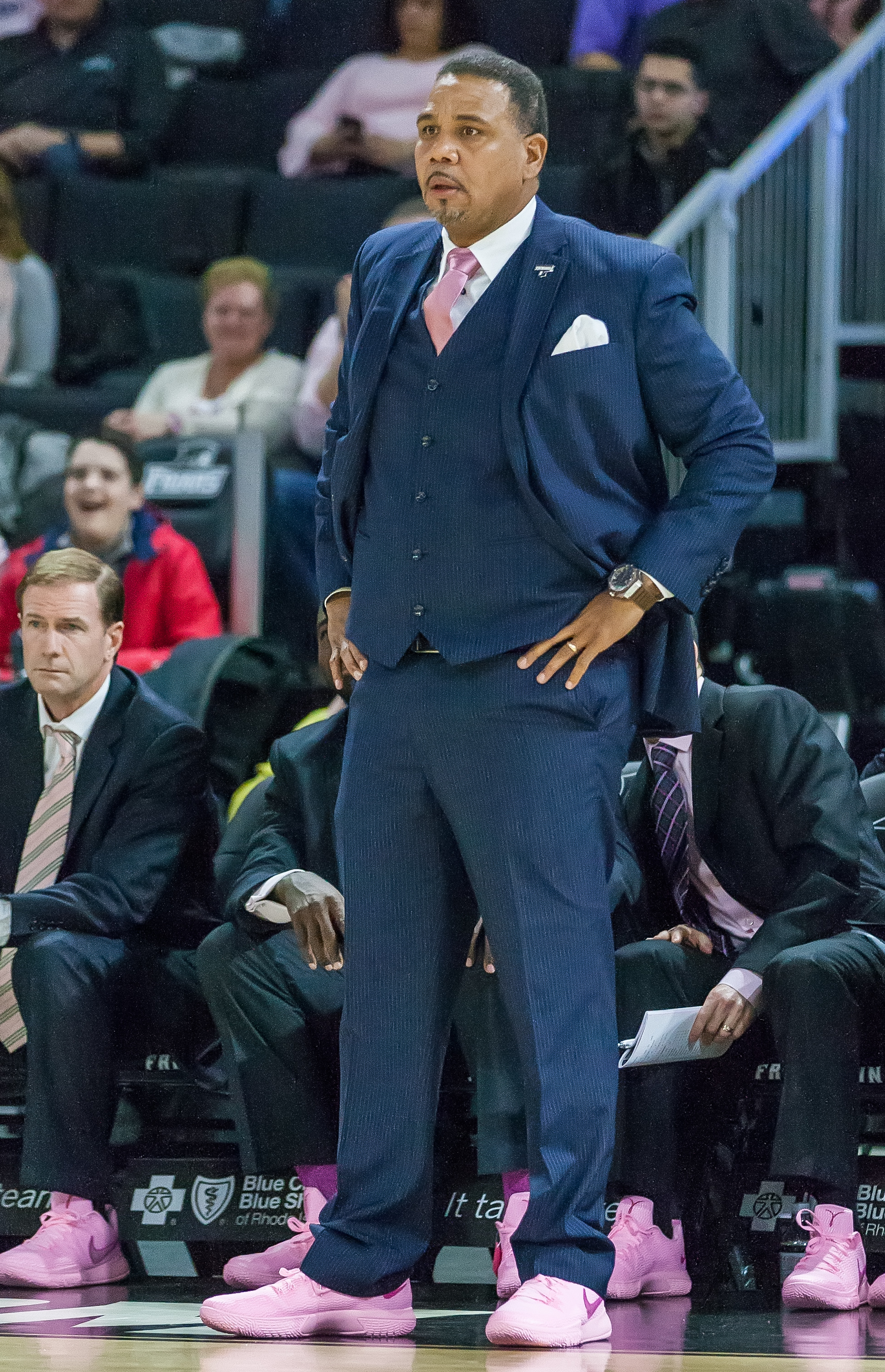
Ed Cooley took on the role of head coach in March 2023.

On March 20, 2023, Ed Cooley accepted an offer to become the new head coach of the Georgetown Hoyas men's basketball team after 12 years in the same role at conference rival Providence College. The decision to hire Cooley was praised as a move likely to strengthen the program.

==== 2023-24 Season ====
The 2023–2024 Hoyas started the season 7–4, with a notable last second win at Notre Dame, its first victory over the Irish on the road since the 2013 season (when they were a fellow member of the Big East). The team lost several close games in conference play, including its much anticipated matchup against Providence, one of the most watched college basketball games of the season. Ultimately Georgetown finished 2–18 in the league and 9–23 overall. The two league wins however matched the number of wins the Hoyas had the prior two seasons combined in Big East play.

==== 2024-25 Season ====
The team's roster was completely overhauled before the 2024–2025 season. Headlined by Top 50 high school recruit Thomas Sorber, reigning Ivy League freshman of the year Malik Mack (from Harvard), and highly regarded graduate transfer Micah Peavy (from TCU), the recruiting class was ranked as the 29th best in the country. The Hoyas got out to their best start in over a decade, as they began the year 12–2. The strong start included Cooley's first win at rival Syracuse in the 100th matchup of the storied rivalry, and a 3–0 record to begin Big East play with wins over Creighton, Seton Hall and Xavier.

Georgetown struggled with injuries down the stretch, most significantly losing Sorber for the season in early February. Georgetown was selected to play in the inaugural 2025 College Basketball Crown postseason tournament in Las Vegas, Nevada. The Hoyas won their opening round game versus Washington State, 85–82 before losing in the Quarterfinals to Nebraska 81–69. The finished the year 18-16 (8-12 in the Big East).

In June, two Hoyas were selected in June at the 2025 NBA Draft. Sorber was chosen 15th overall by the Oklahoma City Thunder, and Peavy went 40th overall to the New Orleans Pelicans. Sorber's selection made him the first player in program history to be drafted directly into the NBA as a freshman. The 2025 draft marked the sixth time since 1980 (and the first time since 2008) that a pair of Georgetown teammates were selected in the same draft.

==== 2025-26 Season ====
After taking large strides in 2024-25, 2026 was a bit of a letdown in comparison. Despite a strong 5–0 start, the team's best since the 2017-18 season, the Hoyas struggled for the remainder of the year. Key players like sophomore center Julius Halaifonua, who many hoped would fill the void left by Sorber, failed to take significant strides and the squad ultimately finished in last place in the Big East for the third time in six seasons. Playing as the 11th seed in the Big East tournament, Georgetown concluded its season with upset victories over DePaul and Villanova before being defeated in the semifinals by UConn.

== Awards and honors ==
Naismith Player of the Year Award

- 1985 - Patrick Ewing

Associated Press Player of the Year

- 1985 - Patrick Ewing

Most Outstanding Player of the NCAA tournament

- 1984 - Patrick Ewing

Big East Player of the Year

- 1980 - John Duren
- 1984 - Patrick Ewing
- 1985 - Patrick Ewing
- 1987 - Reggie Williams
- 1989 - Charles Smith
- 1992 - Alonzo Mourning
- 2007 - Jeff Green
- 2013 - Otto Porter

Big East Rookie of the Year

- 1981 - Fred Brown
- 1982 - Patrick Ewing
- 1993 - Othella Harrington
- 1995 - Allen Iverson
- 2005 - Jeff Green
- 2009 - Greg Monroe
- 2019 - James Akinjo

Big East Defensive Player of the Year

- 1982 - Patrick Ewing
- 1983 - Patrick Ewing
- 1984 - Patrick Ewing
- 1985 - Patrick Ewing
- 1989 - Alonzo Mourning
- 1990 - Alonzo Mourning & Dikembe Mutombo
- 1991 - Dikembe Mutombo
- 1992 - Alonzo Mourning
- 1996 - Allen Iverson

First Team All-American

- 1943 - John Mahnken
- 1982 - Eric "Sleepy" Floyd
- 1983 - Patrick Ewing
- 1984 - Patrick Ewing
- 1985 - Patrick Ewing
- 1987 - Reggie Williams
- 1992 - Alonzo Mourning
- 1996 - Allen Iverson
- 2013 - Otto Porter

Second Team All-American

- 1947 - Dan Kraus
- 1981 - Eric "Sleepy" Floyd
- 1982 - Patrick Ewing
- 1989 - Charles Smith
- 1990 - Alonzo Mourning
- 2008 - Roy Hibbert

Third Team All-American

- 1989 - Alonzo Mourning
- 1991 - Dikembe Mutombo
- 2007 - Jeff Green
- 2010 - Greg Monroe

Honorable Mention All-American

- 1934 - Ed Hargaden
- 1955 - Warren Buehler
- 1963 - Jim Barry
- 1980 - John Duren & Craig Shelton
- 1985 - Bill Martin
- 1986 - Reggie Williams
- 1988 - Perry McDonald
- 1990 - Mark Tillmon & Dikembe Mutombo
- 1995 - Allen Iverson
- 1997 - Victor Page
- 2003 - Mike Sweetney
- 2011 - Austin Freeman

National Coach of the Year

- 1982 - John Thompson
- 1985 - John Thompson
- 1987 - John Thompson

Big East Coach of the Year

- 1980 - John Thompson
- 1987 - John Thompson
- 1992 - John Thompson
- 2013 - John Thompson III

== Season-by-season results ==
Season	Head coach	Conference	Season results							Tournament results		Final poll (Note: The Associated Press began men's basketball team rankings during the 1948–49 season. The Coaches' Poll began publishing its rankings during the 1950–51 season.)	
Season	Head coach	Conference	Overall				Conference			Conference	Postseason	AP	Coaches'
Season	Head coach	Conference	Wins	Losses	%	Wins	Losses	%	Finish	Conference	Postseason	AP	Coaches'
1906–07	No coach (Note: An elected student manager led the team during the 1906-07 season.)	Independent	2	2	.500	—	—	—	—	—	—	none	none
1907–08	Maurice Joyce	Independent	5	1	.833	—	—	—	—	—	—	none	none
1908–09	Maurice Joyce	Independent	9	5	.643	—	—	—	—	—	—	none	none
1909–10	Maurice Joyce	Independent	5	7	.417	—	—	—	—	—	—	none	none
1910–11	Maurice Joyce	Independent	13	7	.650	—	—	—	—	—	—	none	none
1911–12	James Colliflower	Independent	11	6	.647	—	—	—	—	—	—	none	none
1912–13	James Colliflower	Independent	11	5	.688	—	—	—	—	—	—	none	none
1913–14	James Colliflower	Independent	10	6	.625	—	—	—	—	—	—	none	none
1914–15	John O'Reilly	Independent	8	8	.500	—	—	—	—	—	—	none	none
1915–16	John O'Reilly	Independent	9	6	.600	—	—	—	—	—	—	none	none
1916–17	John O'Reilly	Independent	8	4	.667	—	—	—	—	—	—	none	none
1917–18	John O'Reilly	Independent	8	6	.571	—	—	—	—	—	—	none	none
1918–19	John O'Reilly	Independent	9	1	.900	—	—	—	—	—	—	none	none
1919–20	John O'Reilly	Independent	13	1	.929	—	—	—	—	—	—	none	none
1920–21	John O'Reilly	Independent	10	4	.714	—	—	—	—	—	—	none	none
1921–22	James Colliflower	Independent	11	3	.786	—	—	—	—	—	—	none	none
1922–23	Jock Maloney	Independent	8	3	.727	—	—	—	—	—	—	none	none
1923–24	John O'Reilly	Independent	6	3	.667	—	—	—	—	—	—	none	none
1924–25	John O'Reilly	Independent	6	2	.750	—	—	—	—	—	—	none	none
1925–26	John O'Reilly	Independent	5	8	.385	—	—	—	—	—	—	none	none
1926–27	John O'Reilly	Independent	5	4	.556	—	—	—	—	—	—	none	none
1927–28	Elmer Ripley	Independent	12	1	.923	—	—	—	—	—	—	none	none
1928–29	Elmer Ripley	Independent	12	5	.706	—	—	—	—	—	—	none	none
1929–30	Bill Dudack	Independent	13	12	.520	—	—	—	—	—	—	none	none
1930–31	John Colrick	Independent	5	16	.238	—	—	—	—	—	—	none	none
1931–32	Fred Mesmer	Independent	6	11	.353	—	—	—	—	—	—	none	none
1932–33	Fred Mesmer	Eastern Intercollegiate Conference	6	11	.353	3	5	.375	4th	— (Note: The Eastern Intercollegiate Conference never held a post-season tournament during its seven seasons of existence.)	—	none	none
1933–34	Fred Mesmer	Eastern Intercollegiate Conference	12	11	.522	5	5	.500	T-3rd	—	—	none	none
1934–35	Fred Mesmer	Eastern Intercollegiate Conference	6	13	.316	1	7	.125	5th	—	—	none	none
1935–36	Fred Mesmer	Eastern Intercollegiate Conference	7	11	.389	5	5	.500	5th	—	—	none	none
1936–37	Fred Mesmer	Eastern Intercollegiate Conference	9	8	.529	3	7	.300	T-5th	—	—	none	none
1937–38	Fred Mesmer	Eastern Intercollegiate Conference	7	11	.389	5	5	.500	T-3rd	—	—	none	none
1938–39	Elmer Ripley	Eastern Intercollegiate Conference	13	9	.591	6	4	.600	T-1st (Note: In previous seasons, the Eastern Intercollegiate Conference had held a single-game playoff to determine the conference champion in the event of a first-place tie at the end of the regular season. At the end of the 1938-39 season, Georgetown and Carnegie Tech finished tied for first with identical 6-4 conference records, but no playoff game took place. Instead, the teams were declared conference co-champions.)	—	—	none	none
1939–40	Elmer Ripley	Independent	8	10	.444	—	—	—	—	—	—	none	none
1940–41	Elmer Ripley	Independent	16	4	.800	—	—	—	—	—	—	none	none
1941–42	Elmer Ripley	Independent	9	11	.450	—	—	—	—	—	—	none	none
1942–43	Elmer Ripley	Independent	22	5	.815	—	—	—	—	—	NCAA Runner-Up	none	none
1943–44	Basketball program suspended due to World War II (Note: Georgetown suspended all of its athletic programs from 1943 to 1945 because of World War II.)												
1944–45	Basketball program suspended due to World War II												
1945–46	Ken Engles	Independent	11	9	.550	—	—	—	—	—	—	none	none
1946–47	Elmer Ripley	Independent	19	7	.731	—	—	—	—	—	—	none	none
1947–48	Elmer Ripley	Independent	13	15	.464	—	—	—	—	—	—	none	none
1948–49	Elmer Ripley	Independent	9	15	.375	—	—	—	—	—	—	— (Note: First season for the AP Poll)	none
1949–50	Buddy O'Grady	Independent	12	12	.500	—	—	—	—	—	—	—	none
1950–51	Buddy O'Grady	Independent	8	14	.364	—	—	—	—	—	—	—	— (Note: First season for the Coaches' Poll)
1951–52	Buddy O'Grady	Independent	15	10	.600	—	—	—	—	—	—	—	—
1952–53	Buddy Jeannette	Independent	13	7	.650	—	—	—	—	—	NIT first round	—	—
1953–54	Buddy Jeannette	Independent	11	18	.379	—	—	—	—	—	—	—	—
1954–55	Buddy Jeannette	Independent	12	13	.480	—	—	—	—	—	—	—	—
1955–56	Buddy Jeannette	Independent	13	11	.542	—	—	—	—	—	—	—	—
1956–57	Tom Nolan	Independent	11	11	.500	—	—	—	—	—	—	—	—
1957–58	Tom Nolan	Independent	10	11	.476	—	—	—	—	—	—	—	—
1958–59	Tom Nolan	Independent	8	15	.348	—	—	—	—	—	—	—	—
1959–60	Tom Nolan	Independent	11	12	.478	—	—	—	—	—	—	—	—
1960–61	Tommy O'Keefe	Independent	11	10	.524	—	—	—	—	—	—	—	—
1961–62	Tommy O'Keefe	Independent	14	9	.609	—	—	—	—	—	—	—	—
1962–63	Tommy O'Keefe	Independent	13	13	.500	—	—	—	—	—	—	—	—
1963–64	Tommy O'Keefe	Independent	15	10	.600	—	—	—	—	—	—	—	—
1964–65	Tommy O'Keefe	Independent	13	10	.565	—	—	—	—	—	—	—	—
1965–66	Tommy O'Keefe	Independent	16	8	.667	—	—	—	—	—	—	—	—
1966–67	John Magee	Independent	12	11	.522	—	—	—	—	—	—	—	—
1967–68	John Magee	Independent	11	12	.478	—	—	—	—	—	—	—	—
1968–69	John Magee	Independent	12	12	.500	—	—	—	—	—	—	—	—
1969–70	John Magee	Independent	18	7	.720	—	—	—	—	—	NIT first round	—	—
1970–71	John Magee	Independent	12	14	.462	—	—	—	—	—	—	—	—
1971–72	John Magee	Independent	3	23	.115	—	—	—	—	—	—	—	—
1972–73	John Thompson Jr.	Independent	12	14	.462	—	—	—	—	—	—	—	—
1973–74	John Thompson Jr.	Independent	13	13	.500	—	—	—	—	—	—	—	—
1974–75	John Thompson Jr.	Independent	18	10	.643	—	—	—	—	ECAC South Region; Tournament Champions (Note: Although remaining an independent, Georgetown participated annually from 1975 through 1979 in one of the regional ECAC Men's Basketball Tournaments. The Eastern College Athletic Conference (ECAC) – not a true athletic conference, but rather a loose sports federation of colleges and universities in the eastern United States – organized these tournaments beginning in 1975 so that ECAC members who were NCAA Division I independents in basketball could play in post-season tournaments that gave their winners automatic bids to the NCAA Division I men's basketball tournament. In this way, these ECAC tournaments played the same role for independents that conference tournaments did for members of basketball conferences.)	NCAA first round	—	—
1975–76	John Thompson Jr.	Independent	21	7	.750	—	—	—	—	ECAC South Region; Tournament Champions	NCAA first round	—	—
1976–77	John Thompson Jr.	Independent	19	9	.679	—	—	—	—	ECAC South Region; Tournament Semifinal	NIT first round	—	—
1977–78	John Thompson Jr.	Independent	23	8	.742	—	—	—	—	ECAC South-Upstate Region; Tournament Semifinal	NIT Fourth Place	—	20
1978–79	John Thompson Jr.	Independent	24	5	.828	—	—	—	—	ECAC South-Upstate Region; Tournament Champions	NCAA second round	—	12
1979–80	John Thompson Jr.	Big East Conference (Note: Georgetown was a founding member of the original Big East Conference of 1979-2013. In 2013, Georgetown left the original Big East to become a founding member of the new Big East Conference. The original Big East Conference then was renamed the American Athletic Conference.)	26	6	.813	5	1	.833	T-1st	Champions	NCAA Regional Final	11	10
1980–81	John Thompson Jr.	Big East Conference	20	12	.625	9	5	.643	2nd	Semifinal	NCAA first round	—	—
1981–82	John Thompson Jr.	Big East Conference	30	7	.811	10	4	.714	2nd	Champions	NCAA Runner-Up	6	7
1982–83	John Thompson Jr.	Big East Conference	22	10	.688	11	5	.688	4th	Quarterfinal	NCAA second round	20	20
1983–84	John Thompson Jr.	Big East Conference	34	3	.919	14	2	.875	1st	Champions	NCAA National Champions	2	2
1984–85	John Thompson Jr.	Big East Conference	35	3	.921	14	2	.875	2nd	Champions	NCAA Runner-Up	1	1
1985–86	John Thompson Jr.	Big East Conference	24	8	.750	11	5	.688	3rd	Semifinal	NCAA second round	13	15
1986–87	John Thompson Jr.	Big East Conference	29	5	.853	12	4	.750	T-1st	Champions	NCAA Regional Final	4	4
1987–88	John Thompson Jr.	Big East Conference	20	10	.667	9	7	.563	T-3rd	Quarterfinal	NCAA second round	—	—
1988–89	John Thompson Jr.	Big East Conference	29	5	.853	13	3	.813	1st	Champions	NCAA Regional Final	2	2
1989–90	John Thompson Jr.	Big East Conference	24	7	.774	11	5	.688	3rd	Semifinal	NCAA second round	8	6
1990–91	John Thompson Jr.	Big East Conference	19	13	.594	8	8	.500	6th	Final	NCAA second round	—	23
1991–92	John Thompson Jr.	Big East Conference	22	10	.688	12	6	.667	T-1st	Final	NCAA second round	22	18
1992–93	John Thompson Jr.	Big East Conference	20	13	.606	8	10	.444	8th	Quarterfinal	NIT Final	—	—
1993–94	John Thompson Jr.	Big East Conference	19	12	.613	10	8	.556	T-4th	Final	NCAA second round	—	—
1994–95	John Thompson Jr.	Big East Conference	21	10	.677	11	7	.611	4th	Semifinal	NCAA Regional Semifinal	22	16
1995–96	John Thompson Jr.	Big East Conference	29	8	.853	13	5	.813	1st Big East 7 Division	Final	NCAA Regional Final	4	7
1996–97	John Thompson Jr.	Big East Conference	20	10	.667	11	7	.611	1st Big East 7 Division	Semifinal	NCAA first round	—	—
1997–98	John Thompson Jr.	Big East Conference	16	15	.516	6	12	.333	T-5th; Big East 7 Division	Quarterfinal	NIT second round	—	—
1998–99	John Thompson Jr. Craig Esherick (Note: Thompson resigned on January 8, 1999, and Esherick immediately succeeded him as head coach.)	Big East Conference	15	16	.484	6	12	.333	10th	Quarterfinal	NIT first round	—	—
1999–2000	Craig Esherick	Big East Conference	19	15	.559	6	10	.375	T-8th	Semifinal	NIT second round	—	—
2000–01	Craig Esherick	Big East Conference	25	8	.758	10	6	.625	T-2nd; West Division	Quarterfinal	NCAA Regional Semifinal	21	17
2001–02	Craig Esherick	Big East Conference	19	11	.633	9	7	.563	T-3rd; West Division	Quarterfinal	—	—	—
2002–03	Craig Esherick	Big East Conference	19	15	.559	6	10	.375	5th West Division	Quarterfinal	NIT Final	—	—
2003–04	Craig Esherick	Big East Conference	13	14	.481	4	12	.250	T-12th	First round	—	—	—
2004–05	John Thompson III	Big East Conference	19	15	.559	8	8	.500	T-7th	Quarterfinal	NIT Quarterfinal	—	—
2005–06	John Thompson III	Big East Conference	23	10	.697	10	6	.625	T-4th	Semifinal	NCAA Regional Semifinal	23	16
2006–07	John Thompson III	Big East Conference	30	7	.811	13	3	.813	1st	Champions	NCAA Final Four	8	4
2007–08	John Thompson III	Big East Conference	28	6	.824	15	3	.833	1st	Final	NCAA second round	8	12
2008–09	John Thompson III	Big East Conference	16	15	.516	7	11	.389	T-11th	First round	NIT first round	—	—
2009–10	John Thompson III	Big East Conference	23	11	.676	10	8	.556	T-7th	Final	NCAA first round	14	—
2010–11	John Thompson III	Big East Conference	21	11	.656	10	8	.556	T-6th	Second round	Round of 64	—	—
2011–12	John Thompson III	Big East Conference	24	9	.727	12	6	.667	T-4th	Quarterfinal	Round of 32	15	17
2012–13	John Thompson III	Big East Conference	25	6	.806	14	4	.778	T-1st	Semifinal	Round of 64	8	17
2013–14	John Thompson III	Big East Conference	18	15	.545	8	10	.444	7th	First round	NIT second round	–	–
2014–15	John Thompson III	Big East Conference	22	11	.667	12	6	.667	T-2nd	Semifinal	Round of 32	22	24
2015–16	John Thompson III	Big East Conference	15	18	.455	7	11	.389	8th	Quarterfinal	–	–	–
2016–17	John Thompson III	Big East Conference	14	18	.438	5	13	.278	9th	First round	–	–	–
2017–18	Patrick Ewing	Big East Conference	15	15	.500	5	13	.278	8th	First round	–	–	–
2018–19	Patrick Ewing	Big East Conference	19	14	.576	9	9	.500	T-3rd	Quarterfinal	NIT first round	—	—
2019–20	Patrick Ewing	Big East Conference	15	17	.469	5	13	.278	T-8th	First round	Postseason cancelled (COVID-19)	—	—
2020-21	Patrick Ewing	Big East Conference	13	13	.500	7	9	.438	8th	Champions	NCAA first round	—	—
2021–22	Patrick Ewing	Big East Conference	6	25	.194	0	19	.000	11th	First round	—	—	—
2022–23	Patrick Ewing	Big East Conference	7	25	.219	2	18	.100	11th	First round	—	—	—
2023–24	Ed Cooley	Big East Conference	9	23	.281	2	18	.100	10th	First round	—	—	—
2024–25	Ed Cooley	Big East Conference	18	16	.529	8	12	.400	7th	First round	CBC Quarterfinal	—	—
2025–26	Ed Cooley	Big East Conference	16	18	.471	6	14	.300	T-10th	Semifinal	—	—	—

Legend

National champion
National runner-up
Conference regular season and conference tournament champion
Conference regular season champion
Conference division regular season champion
Conference tournament champion

Conference Championships: 11

- Eastern Intercollegiate Conference (1932-1939): 1
- Big East Conference (1979–2013): 10
- Big East Conference (2013–): 0

Conference tournament championships: 11

- ECAC Regional Tournaments: 3 (Note: As an independent, Georgetown won three ECAC regional basketball tournaments, in 1975, 1976, and 1979.)
- Big East Conference (1979–2013): 7
- Big East Conference (2013–): 1

NCAA Tournament

- Appearances: 31
- Final Four appearances: 5
- National runners-up: 3
- National championships: 1
- Overall record: 47–30

National Invitation Tournament

- Appearances: 13
- Runners-up: 2
- Championships: 0
- Overall record: 15–14

== Postseason history ==
=== NCAA tournament seeds ===
The NCAA began seeding the tournament with the 1979 edition.

Year	'79	'80	'81	'82	'83	'84	'85	'86	'87	'88	'89	'90	'91	'92	'94	'95	'96	'97	'01	'06	'07	'08	'10	'11	'12	'13	'15	'21
Seed #	3	3	7	1	5	1	1	4	1	8	1	3	8	6	9	6	2	10	10	7	2	2	3	6	3	2	4	12

=== NCAA tournament results ===
Georgetown has made 31 appearances in the NCAA Division I men's basketball tournament. They have a record of 47–30. The Hoyas won the national championship in 1984.

Year	Round	Opponent	Result
1943	Elite Eight; Final Four; National Championship Game	NYU; DePaul; Wyoming	W 55–36; W 53–49; L 34–46
1975	Quarterfinals	Central Michigan	L 75–77
1976	Quarterfinals	Arizona	L 76–83
1979	Second Round	Rutgers	L 58–64
1980	Second Round; Sweet Sixteen; Elite Eight	Iona; Maryland; Iowa	W 74–71; W 74–68; L 80–81
1981	First round	James Madison	L 55–61
1982	Second Round; Sweet Sixteen; Elite Eight; Final Four; National Championship Game	Wyoming; Fresno State; Oregon State; Louisville; North Carolina	W 51–43; W 58–40; W 69–45; W 50–46; L 62–63
1983	First round Second Round	Alcorn State; Memphis State	W 68–63; L 57–66
1984	Second Round; Sweet Sixteen; Elite Eight; Final Four; National Championship Game	SMU; UNLV; Dayton; Kentucky; Houston	W 37–36; W 62–48; W 61–49; W 53–40; W 84–75
1985	First round Second Round; Sweet Sixteen; Elite Eight; Final Four; National Championship Game	Lehigh; Temple; Loyola-Chicago; Georgia Tech; St. John's; Villanova	W 68–43; W 63–46; W 65–53; W 60–54; W 77–59; L 64–66
1986	First round Second Round	Texas Tech; Michigan State	W 70–64; L 68–80
1987	First round Second Round; Sweet Sixteen; Elite Eight	Bucknell; Ohio State; Kansas; Providence	W 75–53; W 82–79; W 70–57; L 73–88
1988	First round Second Round	LSU; Temple	W 66–63; L 53–74
1989	First round Second Round; Sweet Sixteen; Elite Eight	Princeton; Notre Dame; North Carolina State; Duke	W 50–49; W 81–74; W 69–61; L 77–85
1990	First round Second Round	Texas Southern; Xavier	W 70–52; L 71–74
1991	First round Second Round	Vanderbilt; UNLV	W 70–60; L 54–62
1992	First round Second Round	South Florida; Florida State	W 75–60; L 68–78
1994	First round Second Round	Illinois; Arkansas	W 84–77; L 73–85
1995	First round Second Round; Sweet Sixteen	Xavier; Weber State; North Carolina	W 68–63; W 53–51; L 64–74
1996	First round Second Round; Sweet Sixteen; Elite Eight	Mississippi Valley State; New Mexico; Texas Tech; UMass	W 93–56; W 75–65; W 98–90; L 62–86
1997	First round	UNC Charlotte	L 67–79
2001	First round Second Round; Sweet Sixteen	Arkansas; Hampton; Maryland	W 63–61; W 76–57; L 66–76
2006	First round Second Round; Sweet Sixteen	Northern Iowa; Ohio State; Florida	W 54–49; W 70–52; L 53–57
2007	First round Second Round; Sweet Sixteen; Elite Eight; Final Four	Belmont; Boston College; Vanderbilt; North Carolina; Ohio State	W 80–55; W 62–55; W 66–65; W 96–84 ^{OT} L 60–67
2008	First round Second Round	UMBC; Davidson	W 66–47; L 70–74
2010	First round	Ohio	L 83–97
2011	First round	VCU	L 56–74
2012	First round Second Round	Belmont; North Carolina State	W 74–59; L 63–66
2013	First round	Florida Gulf Coast	L 68–78
2015	First round Second Round	Eastern Washington; Utah	W 84–74; L 64–75
2021	First round	Colorado	L 73–96

=== NIT results ===
The Hoyas have gone to the National Invitation Tournament 13 times and declined their invitation on a 14th occasion. They have a record of 15–14.

Year	Round	Opponent	Result
1953	First round	Louisville	L 79–92
1970	First round	LSU	L 82–83
1977	First round	Virginia Tech	L 79–83
1978	First round Second Round; Semifinal; Third-place game	Virginia; Dayton; North Carolina State; Rutgers	W 80–78^{OT} W 71–62; L 85–86; L 72–85
1993	First round Second Round; Third round Semifinal; Final	Arizona State; UTEP; Miami (Ohio); UAB; Minnesota	W 78–68; W 71–44; W 66–53; W 45–41; L 61–62
1998	First round Second Round	Florida; Georgia Tech	W 71–69; L 79–80^{OT}
1999	First round	Princeton	L 47–54
2000	First round Second Round	Virginia; California	W 115–111^{3OT} L 49–60
2002	Declined invitation		
2003	First round Second Round; Quarterfinal; Semifinal; Final	Tennessee; Providence; North Carolina; Minnesota; St. John's	W 70–60; W 67–58; W 79–74; W 88–74; L 67–70
2005	First round Second Round; Quarterfinal	Boston University; Cal State Fullerton; South Carolina	W 64–34; W 74–57; L 66–69
2009	First round	Baylor	L 72–74
2014	First round Second Round	West Virginia; Florida State	W 77–65; L 90–101
2019	First round	Harvard	L 68–71

=== CBC results ===
Georgetown has appeared in the College Basketball Crown once. Their overall record is 1–1.

Year	Round	Opponent	Result
2025	First Round; Quarterfinals	Washington State; Nebraska	W 85–82; L 69–81

== Coaches ==
- No coach (1906–1907) – student manager Lou Murray ran the team
- Maurice Joyce (1907–1911)
- James Colliflower (1911–1914, 1921–1922)
- John D. O'Reilly (1914–1921, 1923–1927)
- Jock Maloney (1922–1923)
- Elmer Ripley (1927–1929, 1938–1943, 1946–1949)
- Bill Dudak (1929–1930)
- John T. Colrick (1930–1931)
- Fred Mesmer (1931–1938)
- Program suspended (1943–1945) due to World War II
- Ken Engles (1945–1946)
- Buddy O'Grady (1949–1952)
- Buddy Jeannette (1952–1956)
- Tommy Nolan (1956–1960)
- Tommy O'Keefe (1960–1966)
- Jack Magee (1966–1972)
- John Thompson Jr. (1972–1999)
- Craig Esherick (1999–2004)
- John Thompson III (2004–2017)
- Patrick Ewing (2017–2023)
- Ed Cooley (2023–present)

== Traditions ==
=== Rivalries ===
Syracuse University

Georgetown's biggest rival is Syracuse. The two schools have been playing each other since 1930, but their rivalry was solidified in the 1980s as the respective programs were the leading powers during the infancy of the newly formed Big East conference. In 1980, the first season of new conference, Georgetown famously ended Syracuse's 57-game home winning streak in the final game to be played at Manley Field House before moving to the Carrier Dome. After the win, Georgetown coach John Thompson declared, "Manley Field House is officially closed". Weeks later, the two schools met in the inaugural Big East Championship, with Georgetown prevailing 87–81. The teams met in four Big East tournament championship games during the 1980s, with Georgetown winning all four contests.

The animosity between the programs was further extended when Syracuse announced their decision to leave the Big East effective in 2013 to join the ACC, forcing the split of "Catholic Seven" and the football-playing schools. This led to the creation of the reformed Big East Conference and the American Athletic Conference. However, Georgetown and Syracuse have continued to play each other in all but one of the years following their exit from the conference. The rivalry is currently renewed through the 2024–25 season.

Villanova University

As a fellow Catholic institution and conference foe, Villanova has been a natural rival for the Hoyas for many years. The schools are the two winningest programs in Big East Conference history. The rivalry is best known for the 1985 NCAA Championship Game where No. 8-seeded Villanova upset the highly favored and top-ranked Hoyas 66–64, preventing Georgetown from winning back-to-back titles.

Among current Big East Conference foes, Georgetown and Villanova are the closest in proximity, with roughly 100 miles separating the campuses.

St. John's University

Having first played each other in 1909, St. John's is one of Georgetown's oldest rivals. The two teams played off and on since that first contest until 1965, when they began annually scheduled games, and they only intensified when both programs became founding members of the Big East Conference in 1979. The rivalry was brought to national attention during the 1984-85 NCAA Division I men's basketball season when both programs were ranked No. 1 and No. 2 throughout the season and met on a total of four occasions, including the famous "Sweater Game" at Madison Square Garden, the 1985 Big East Championship, and the 1985 Final Four. The Hoyas won 3 of the 4 matchups that year.

The rivalry gained renewed interest when both schools remained in the new Big East Conference following the many iterations of conference alignment.

University of Connecticut

An original member of the Big East, UConn and Georgetown battled for conference supremacy for multiple decades, until UConn left the conference to join the American Athletic Conference in 2013. One of the most intense periods for the rivalry was the 1995–1996 season where both teams found themselves ranked in the Top 5 throughout most of the year, led by stars Allen Iverson and Ray Allen respectively. During the regular season, Georgetown upset then ranked No. 3 UConn in Washington, D.C., but a few weeks later at Madison Square Garden, UConn prevailed in a classic Big East tournament Final 75–74, on a last second shot by Allen.

UConn is the only team to match Georgetown's record of 10 regular season titles and 8 conference tournament titles. The schools continued to play each other in their non-conference schedule, and have renewed their rivalry now that UConn has returned to the league in 2020.

=== Blue and gray ===
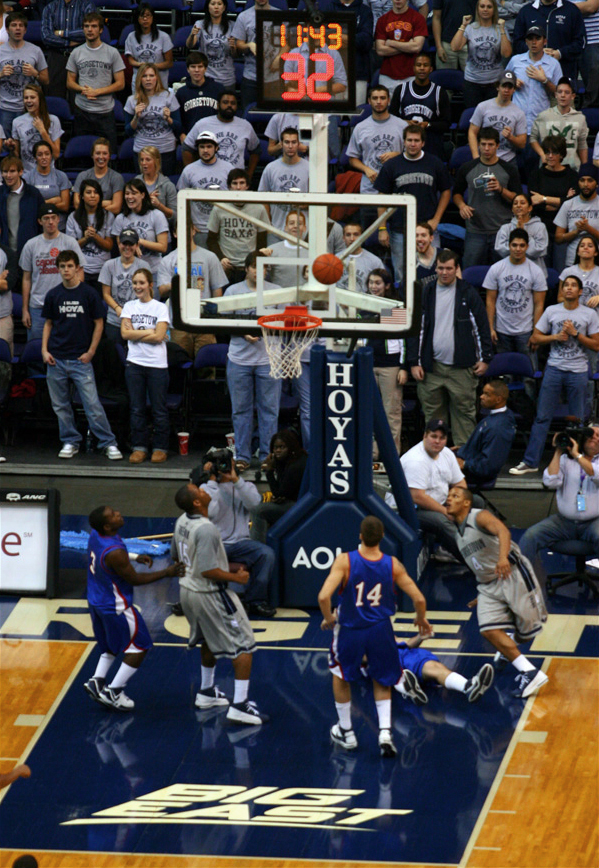
A "Gray Out" at the Verizon Center – later renamed Capital One Arena – in Washington, D.C., as Georgetown plays American on December 29, 2007.

Georgetown's official colors are blue and gray. The colors were selected in 1876 by the Georgetown College Boat Club (the original crew team) in honor of Georgetown students and alumni who wore the Union blue and Confederate gray in the Civil War. A student committee declared blue and gray "as appropriate colors for the Boat Club and expressive of the feeling of unity between the Northern and Southern boys of the College", and recommended its adoption for the team. By the time the men's varsity basketball team was formed, the blue and gray colors were already widely adopted by the school.

Presently, Georgetown is one of the few teams to wear gray as their primary home uniform color, as traditionally teams wear white uniforms at home (though the Hoyas do have a white alternate jersey that is worn on occasion). Fans are generally encouraged to wear gray to home games, and sellouts are referred to as a "gray out."

=== Kenner League ===
Each summer Georgetown University's McDonough Gymnasium hosts the Kenner League. Named after one of the founders and first director of the Metropolitan Police Boys' and Girls' Club of Washington, D.C., the Kenner league is the only NCAA sanctioned summer league in Washington, D.C. Formed in 1982, the league allows Georgetown players to continue their development in an NCAA-structured environment, and to stay within view of watchful eyes on a college campus (even if the coaches were not allowed there by NCAA rules). From its humble beginnings, the Kenner legacy continued to build throughout the 1980s, with coverage in The Washington Post beginning around 1986, then a high school bracket following soon thereafter, and ultimately the arrival of "senior" teams featuring a mix of former Georgetown players, visiting NBA stars, and local hoop legends.

Kenner continued to grow, with more fans making the trip weekly to the gymnasium for a series of weeknight and weekend games each summer. As new recruits arrived at Georgetown, following them at the Kenner League became a priority for fans. Many fans might think Georgetown runs the Kenner League, but it does not. The league is an independent effort, whose organizers must raise money from Nike and team sponsors to cover the cost of officials, jerseys, and other organizational costs, and maintain NCAA certification. As summer leagues go, Kenner is among the longest running of its kind. Since the league has been in existence, nearly 200 Georgetown players have played in the Kenner League. After nearly a two-year break due to COVID-19, Kenner League returned in the summer of 2022.

== Alumni ==
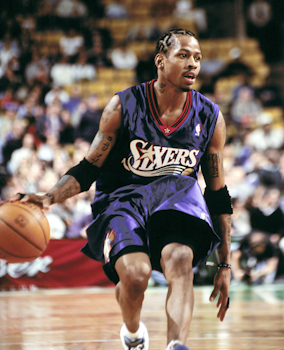
Allen Iverson

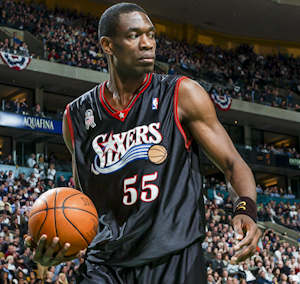
Dikembe Mutombo

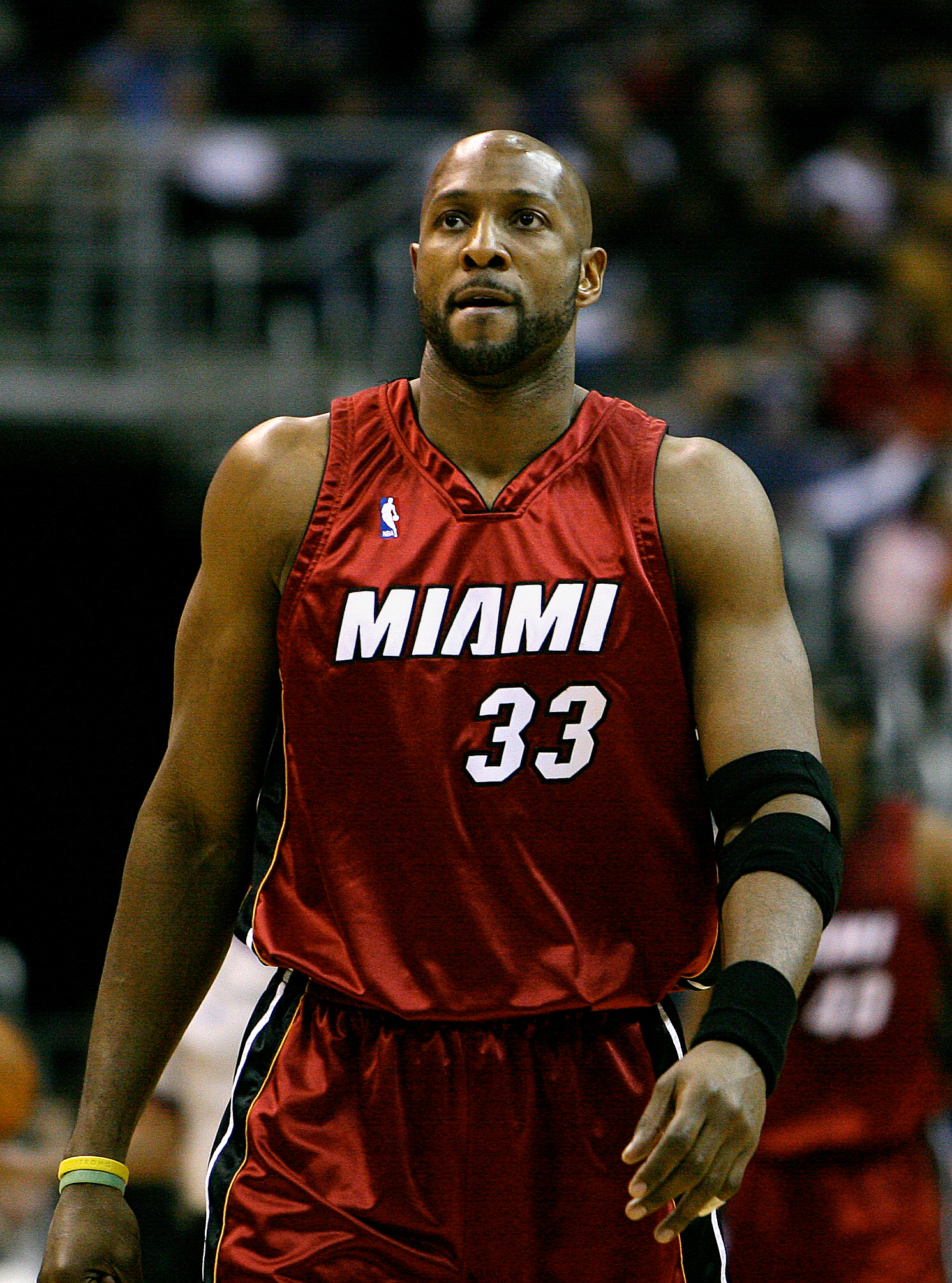
Alonzo Mourning

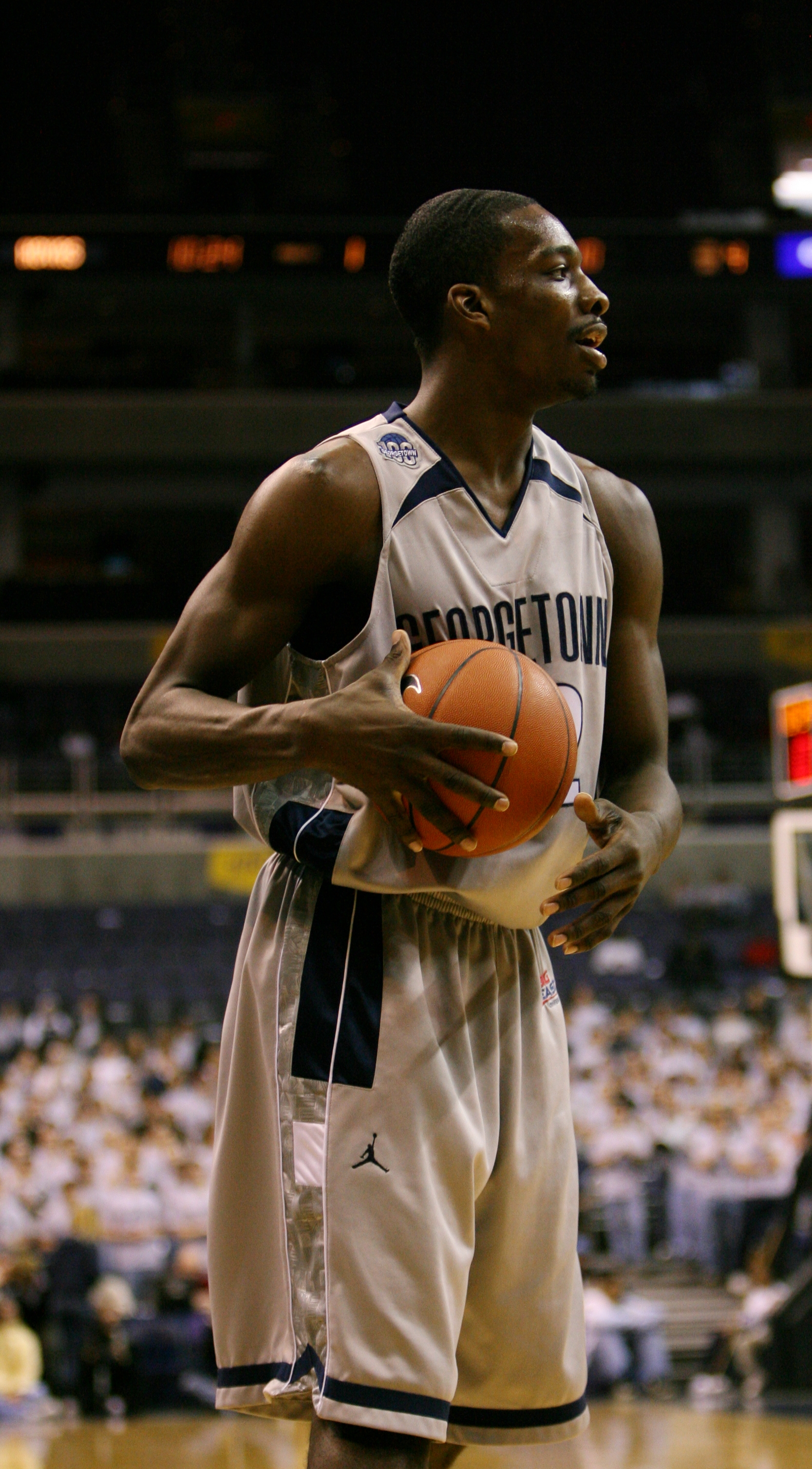
Jeff Green

The Hoyas have an excellent history of preparing players for the NBA. Two Hoyas were the NBA first overall draft picks: Patrick Ewing in 1985 and Allen Iverson in 1996. Alonzo Mourning was the second overall pick in the 1992 draft. Dikembe Mutombo also was drafted in the first round, 4th overall Other alumni have gone undrafted, but entered the NBA later, such as Jaren Jackson in 1989 and Henry Sims and Chris Wright in 2013, and 3-time NBA Dunk Contest champion, Mac McClung

Several Hoya basketball players are famous purely for their off-court accomplishments. Brendan Gaughan, who walked onto the basketball squad, is a driver in NASCAR's Truck Series and also raced one season in the Cup Series. James L. Jones, who played for the Hoyas in the mid-1960s before joining the Marine Corps, went on to become Commandant of the Marine Corps, Supreme Allied Commander Europe, and President Obama's National Security Advisor. Paul Tagliabue, who played in the early 1960s and was one of the leading rebounders in school history, became Commissioner of the National Football League from 1989 to 2006 and later served as Georgetown's Chairman of the board of directors. Henry Hyde, who led Georgetown to its first national final, was elected a member of Congress from Illinois and Chairman of House Judiciary Committee. He received the nation's highest civilian honor, the Medal of Freedom. William Shea, who played in the 1920s, was the New York attorney who brought the New York Mets to the city. Shea Stadium, now demolished and replaced on-site by the Mets' current home of Citi Field, was named in his honor.

=== NBA draft picks ===
Year	Round	Pick	Overall	Name	Team
2025	2	10	40	Micah Peavy	Washington Wizards
2025	1	15	15	Thomas Sorber	Oklahoma City Thunder
2013	1	3	3	Otto Porter Jr.	Washington Wizards
2010	1	7	7	Greg Monroe	Detroit Pistons
2009	2	5	35	DaJuan Summers	Detroit Pistons
2008	1	17	17	Roy Hibbert	Indiana Pacers
2008	2	13	42	Patrick Ewing Jr.	Sacramento Kings
2007	1	5	5	Jeff Green	Boston Celtics
2003	1	9	9	Mike Sweetney	New York Knicks
2001	2	21	50	Ruben Boumtje-Boumtje	Portland Trail Blazers
1998	2	14	43	Jahidi White	Washington Wizards
1996	1	1	1	Allen Iverson	Philadelphia 76ers
1996	1	26	26	Jerome Williams	Detroit Pistons
1996	2	1	30	Othella Harrington	Houston Rockets
1995	2	29	58	Don Reid	Detroit Pistons
1992	1	2	2	Alonzo Mourning	Charlotte Hornets
1991	1	4	4	Dikembe Mutombo	Denver Nuggets
1987	1	4	4	Reggie Williams	Los Angeles Clippers
1986	2	20	44	David Wingate	Philadelphia 76ers
1986	2	23	47	Michael Jackson	New York Knicks
1986	4	6	76	Michael Graham	Seattle SuperSonics
1986	7	3	142	Ralph Dalton	Cleveland Cavaliers
1985	1	1	1	Patrick Ewing	New York Knicks
1985	2	2	26	Bill Martin	Indiana Pacers
1984	5	1	94	Gene Smith	Indiana Pacers
1984	9	11	195	Fred Brown	Atlanta Hawks
1982	1	13	13	Sleepy Floyd	New Jersey Nets
1982	4	10	79	Eric Smith	Portland Trail Blazers
1982	8	23	184	Ed Spriggs	Boston Celtics
1981	10	6	209	Mike Frazier	Atlanta Hawks
1980	1	19	19	John Duren	Utah Jazz
1980	2	5	28	Craig Shelton	Atlanta Hawks
1980	8	16	176	Al Dutch	Seattle SuperSonics
1979	10	18	202	Steve Martin	Washington Bullets
1978	4	11	77	Derrick Jackson	Golden State Warriors
1978	7	14	145	Ed Hopkins	Washington Bullets
1976	8	15	137	Merlin Wilson	Washington Bullets
1972	4	16	63	Art White	Milwaukee Bucks
1970	16	3	225	Paul Favorite	Cincinnati Royals
1969	11	8	149	Jim Supple	Cincinnati Royals
1967	2	2	14	Steve Sullivan	Detroit Pistons
1967	8	7	86	Frank Holloendoner	Cincinnati Royals
1964	10	1	78	Jim Christy	New York Knicks
1962	7	5	57	Bob Sharpenter	Syracuse Nationals
Active players Top overall pick

=== Basketball Hall of Fame inductees ===
- Elmer Ripley (coach) - inducted in 1973
- Buddy Jeannette (coach) - inducted in 1994 (as a player)
- John Thompson (coach) - inducted in 1999
- Patrick Ewing - inducted in 2008
- Alonzo Mourning - inducted in 2014
- Dikembe Mutombo - inducted in 2015
- Allen Iverson - inducted in 2016

== See also ==
- Big East Conference
- Georgetown Hoyas women's basketball
- Georgetown Hoyas
