= 1935–36 Georgetown Hoyas men's basketball team =

American college basketball season

1935–36 Georgetown Hoyas men's basketball
- Conference: Eastern Intercollegiate Conference
- Record: 7–11 (4-6 EIC)
- Head coach: Fred Mesmer (5th season)
- Captains: Don Gibeau; Ben Zola
- Home arena: Tech Gymnasium

1935–36 Eastern Intercollegiate Conference men's basketball standings
	Conf.				Overall
Team	W		L	PCT	W		L	PCT
Carnegie Tech†	7	–	3	.700	8	–	3	.727
Pittsburgh	7	–	3	.700	18	–	9	.667
Temple	6	–	4	.600	18	–	6	.750
West Virginia	6	–	4	.600	16	–	8	.667
Georgetown	4	–	6	.400	7	–	11	.389
Penn State	0	–	10	.000	6	–	11	.353
† Postseason conference championship playoff game winner As of end of 1935-36 season

The 1935–36 Georgetown Hoyas men's basketball team represented Georgetown University during the 1935–36 NCAA college basketball season. Fred Mesmer coached it in his fifth season as head coach. The team was a member of the Eastern Intercollegiate Conference (EIC) and played its home games at Tech Gymnasium on the campus of McKinley Technical High School in Washington, D.C. The team finished with a record of 7-11 overall, 4–6 in the EIC.

== Season recap ==
Sophomore forward Mike Petrosky joined the team this season. Tall for the era at 6-feet-4 (193 cm), he was pressed into service as the team's center, and performed well in this role on both defense and offense, averaging 5.5 points per game for the year. On January 16, 1936, he scored the winning basket in the final minute of overtime in Georgetown's 43–42 win over Pittsburgh and on defense prevented the Panthers from scoring to win in the final seconds. On February 7, 1936, he matched up successfully on defense against New York University's All-American center Mort "King Kong" Klein as the Hoyas upset formerly top-ranked NYU 36–34.

Sophomore forward Harry Bassin was another newcomer to the team. He quickly became its leader, scoring in every game and finishing with a team-high average of 9.0 points per game. He scored a team-high 11 points in the upset of NYU.

== Roster ==
Sophomore guard Tom Nolan would go on to serve as Georgetown's head basketball coach from 1956 to 1960, and as the school's baseball coach until the end of the 1978 season.

#	Name	Height	Weight (lbs.)	Position	Class	Hometown	Previous Team(s)
50	John Eckenrode	N/A	N/A	F	So.	Lancaster, PA, U.S.	N/A
51	Karl Nau	N/A	N/A	G	Jr.	Washington, DC, U.S.	Central HS
52	Don Gibeau	N/A	N/A	G	Jr.	Syracuse, NY, U.S.	Christian Brothers Academy
55	Mario Gregorio	5'8"	N/A	G	So.	Washington, DC, U.S.	Central HS
56	Leon Esenstadt	N/A	N/A	F	Sr.	N/A	N/A
62	Ben Zola	N/A	N/A	G	Jr.	Washington, DC, U.S.	Eastern HS
80	Tom Nolan	N/A	N/A	F	So.	Washington, DC, U.S.	Eastern HS
81	Johnny Frank	N/A	N/A	F	So.	Tuckahoe, NY, U.S.	Horace Greeley HS
82	Carroll Shore	N/A	N/A	G	So.	Washington, DC, U.S.	Central HS
84	Harry Bassin	N/A	N/A	G	So.	Washington, DC, U.S.	Eastern HS
85	Mike Petrosky	6'4"	N/A	C	So.	New London, CT, U.S.	Bulkeley HS
N/A	Ed Bodine	N/A	N/A	F	Jr.	N/A	N/A
N/A	Lou Nau	N/A	N/A	G	So.	Washington, DC, U.S.	Central HS

== 1935–36 schedule and results ==
Date time, TV	Opponent	Result	Record	Site city, state
Regular Season
Fri., Dec. 13, 1935* no, no	Western Maryland	W 46–13	1-0	Tech Gymnasium; Washington, DC
Wed., Dec. 18, 1935 no, no	Temple	L 43–44 ^{OT}	1-1 (0-1)	Tech Gymnasium; Washington, DC
Thu., Jan. 9, 1936* no, no	at St. John's	L 27–41	1-2	DeGray Gymnasium; Queens, NY
Fri., Jan. 10, 1936* no, no	at Manhattan	L 24–34	1-3	Manhattan Gymnasium; New York, NY
Thu., Jan. 16, 1936 no, no	Pittsburgh	W 43–42 ^{OT}	2-3 (1-1)	Tech Gymnasium; Washington, DC
Fri., Jan. 24, 1936 no, no	Carnegie Tech	L 31–37	2-4 (1-2)	Tech Gymnasium; Washington, DC
Tue., Jan. 28, 1936* no, no	at Yale	L 38–44	2-5	Payne Whitney Gymnasium; New Haven, CT
Wed., Jan. 29, 1936* no, no	at Army	W 43–31	3-5	Hayes Gymnasium; West Point, NY
Thu., Jan. 30, 1936 no, no	at Temple	L 17–39	3-6 (1-3)	Mitten Hall; Philadelphia, PA
Tue., Feb. 4, 1936* no, no	at Canisius	L 36–43	3-7	Elmwood Hall; Buffalo, NY
Fri., Feb. 7, 1936* no, no	New York University	W 36–34	4-7	Tech Gymnasium; Washington, DC
Tue., Feb. 11, 1936 no, no	West Virginia	W 42–36 ^{OT}	5-7 (2-3)	Tech Gymnasium; Washington, DC
Fri., Feb. 14, 1936 no, no	at Carnegie Tech	L 23–27	5-8 (2-4)	Skibo Gymnasium; Pittsburgh, PA
Sat., Feb. 15, 1936 no, no	at Penn State	W 37–29	6-8 (3-4)	Recreation Hall; State College, PA
Fri., Feb. 21, 1936* no, no	Maryland	L 39–47	6-9	Tech Gymnasium; Washington, DC
Wed., Feb. 26, 1936 no, no	Penn State	W 34–27	7-9 (4-4)	Tech Gymnasium; Washington, DC
Thu., Mar. 5, 1936 no, no	at Pittsburgh	L 36–43	7-10 (4-5)	Pitt Pavilion; Pittsburgh, PA
Fri., Mar. 6, 1936 no, no	at West Virginia	L 26–41	7-11 (4-6)	WVU Field House; Morgantown, WV
*Non-conference game. (#) Tournament seedings in parentheses.
