= 1953 National Invitation Tournament =

Annual NCAA basketball competition

- Season: 1952–53
- Teams: 12
- Finals site: Madison Square Garden, New York City
- Champions: Seton Hall Pirates (1st title)
- Runner-up: St. John's Red Storm (3rd title game)
- Semifinalists: Duquesne Dukes (4th semifinal); Manhattan Jaspers (1st semifinal)
- Winning coach: Honey Russell (1st title)
- MVP: Walter Dukes (Seton Hall)

The 1953 National Invitation Tournament was the 1953 edition of the annual NCAA college basketball competition.

== Selected teams ==
Below is a list of the 12 teams selected for the tournament.

Team	Conference	Overall record	Appearance	Last bid
BYU	Mountain States		2nd	1951
Duquesne	Independent		6th	1952
Georgetown	Independent		1st	Never
La Salle	Independent		5th	1952
Louisville	Independent		2nd	1952
Manhattan	Metro NY		3rd	1949
Niagara	Western NY Little 3		2nd	1950
St. John's	Metro NY		12th	1952
Saint Louis	Missouri Valley		5th	1952
Seton Hall	Independent		4th	1952
Tulsa	Missouri Valley		1st	Never
Western Kentucky	OVC		7th	1952

== Bracket ==
Below is the tournament bracket.

First round
St. John's	81
Saint Louis	66
Duquesne	88
Tulsa	69
Louisville	92
Georgetown	79
Niagara	82
BYU	76

Quarterfinals
St. John's	75
La Salle	74
Western Kentucky	61
Duquesne	69
Louisville	66
Manhattan	79
Seton Hall	79
Niagara	74

Semifinals
St. John's	64
Duquesne	55
Manhattan	56
Seton Hall	74

Finals
St. John's	46
Seton Hall	58

Third place game
Duquesne	81
Manhattan	67

== See also ==
- 1953 NCAA basketball tournament
- 1953 NAIA Basketball Tournament
