= List of Georgetown Hoyas men's basketball seasons =

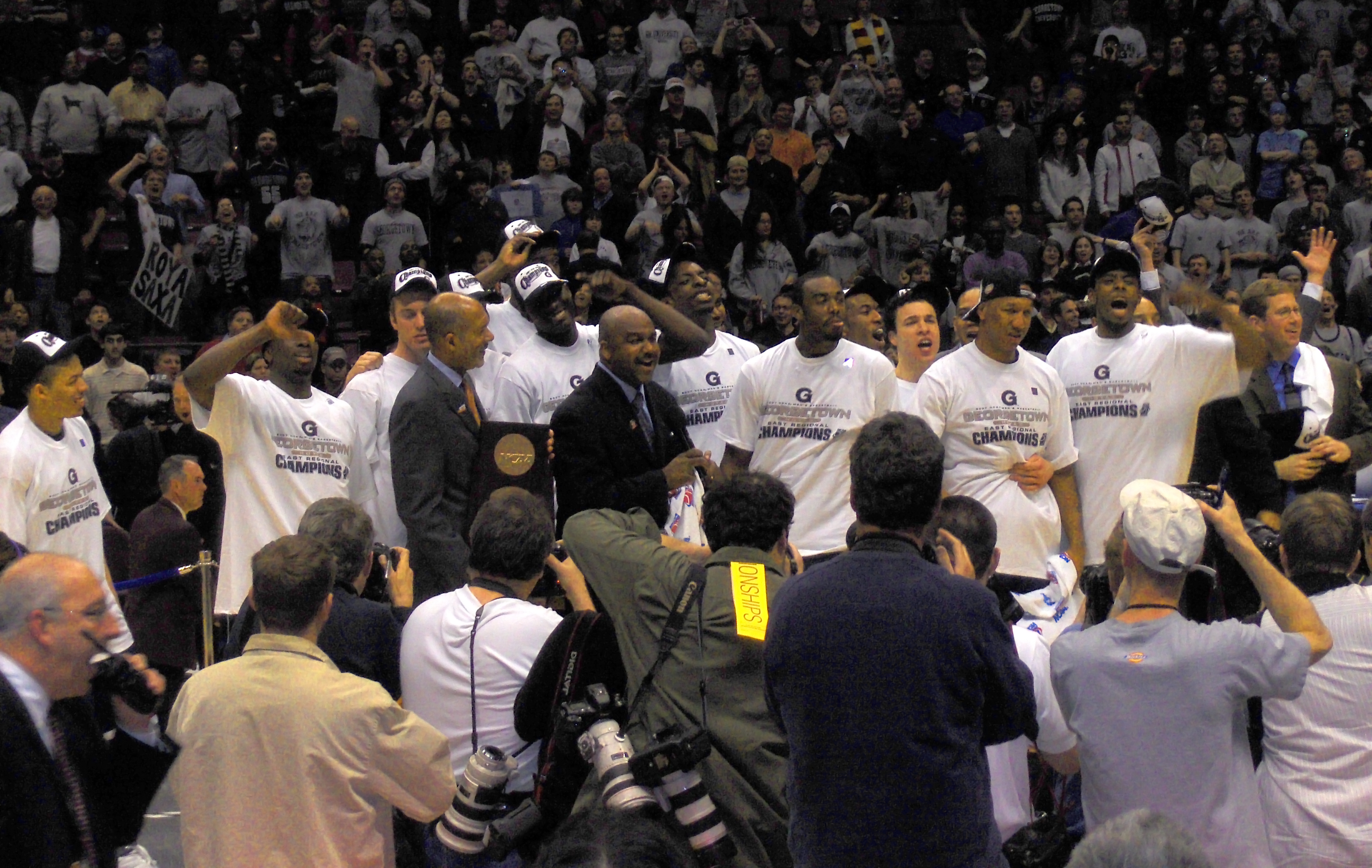
The 2006–07 team, which marked the 100th anniversary of the program, is the most recent to advance to the Final Four in the NCAA Tournament.

This is a list of the seasons completed by the Georgetown Hoyas men's basketball team, the most successful and well-known sports program at Georgetown University. It won the NCAA Men's Division I Basketball Championship in 1984 (over the University of Houston) under coach John Thompson Jr. The Hoyas also reached and lost the championship game in 1943 (to Wyoming), 1982 (to North Carolina), and 1985 (to Big East rival Villanova). The Hoyas have appeared in the NCAA Tournament 31 times in all, making it to the Final Four in 1943, 1982, 1984, 1985, and 2007.

The Hoyas have appeared in the National Invitation Tournament (NIT) thirteen times – turning down an invitation to the NIT on two other occasions – and twice have advanced to the NIT final, losing in 1993 to Minnesota and in 2003 to Big East rival St. John's. In 2025, Georgetown took part in the inaugural postseason College Basketball Crown tournament.

The team was very successful in the original Big East Conference of 1979–2013: it won or tied for the regular-season conference title in 1980, 1984, 1987, 1989, 1992, 2007, and 2008, and won regular-season division titles in 1996 and 1997. The team was even more dominant in the Big East men's basketball tournament during the 1980s: it won in 1980, 1982, 1984, 1985, 1987, and 1989, and later won in 2007 as well. Georgetown and six other Big East universities left the original Big East Conference to join a new Big East Conference in 2013, the old Big East conference then renaming itself the American Athletic Conference (marketed as "the American"). Georgetown won its first Big East tournament in the new Big East in 2021, its eight total tournament championships tying it with Connecticut for the most of any team in the combined history of the two Big East Conferences.

During the five seasons immediately preceding the formation of the original Big East, Georgetown was very successful in the Eastern College Athletic Conference's regional Division I ECAC Men's Basketball Tournaments for Northeastern independents, winning regional championships in 1975, 1976, and 1979.

Georgetown was a founding member of the Eastern Intercollegiate Conference (EIC) in 1932 and remained a member until the conference disbanded in 1939. Georgetown was the EIC's regular-season co-champion in 1939.

== Seasons ==
Record table
Season	Coach	Overall	Conference	Standing	Postseason
No coach (Independent) (1906–1907)
1906–07	No coach^{[Note A]}	2–2			
No-coach era:		2–2			
Maurice Joyce (Independent) (1907–1911)
1907–08	Maurice Joyce	5–1			
1908–09	Maurice Joyce	9–5			
1909–10	Maurice Joyce	5–7			
1910–11	Maurice Joyce	13–7			
Maurice Joyce:		32–20			
James Colliflower (Independent) (1911–1914)
1911–12	James Colliflower	11–6			
1912–13	James Colliflower	11–5			
1913–14	James Colliflower	10–6			
James Colliflower (1911–1914):		32–18			
John O'Reilly (Independent) (1914–1921)
1914–15	John O'Reilly	8–8			
1915–16	John O'Reilly	9–6			
1916–17	John O'Reilly	8–4			
1917–18	John O'Reilly	8–6			
1918–19	John O'Reilly	9–1			
1919–20	John O'Reilly	13–1			
1920–21	John O'Reilly	10–4			
John O'Reilly (1914–1921):		65–30			
James Colliflower (Independent) (1921–1922)
1921–22	James Colliflower	11–3			
James Colliflower (1921–1922):		11–3			
James Colliflower (overall):		43–21			
Jackie Maloney (Independent) (1922–1923)
1922–23	Jackie Maloney	8–3			
Jackie Maloney:		8–3			
John O'Reilly (Independent) (1923–1927)
1923–24	John O'Reilly	6–3			
1924–25	John O'Reilly	6–2			
1925–26	John O'Reilly	5–8			
1926–27	John O'Reilly	5–4			
John O'Reilly (1923–1927):		22–17			
John O'Reilly (overall):		87–47			
Elmer Ripley (Independent) (1927–1929)
1927–28	Elmer Ripley	12–1			
1928–29	Elmer Ripley	12–5			
Elmer Ripley (1927–1929):		24–6			
Bill Dudack (Independent) (1929–1930)
1929–30	Bill Dudack	13–12			
Bill Dudack:		13–12			
John Colrick (Independent) (1930–1931)
1930–31	John Colrick	5–16			
John Colrick:		5–16			
Fred Mesmer (Independent) (1931–1932)
1931–32	Fred Mesmer	6–11			
Fred Mesmer (Eastern Intercollegiate Conference) (1932–1938)
1932–33	Fred Mesmer	6–11	3–5	4th	
1933–34	Fred Mesmer	12–11	5–5	T–3rd	
1934–35	Fred Mesmer	6–13	1–7	5th	
1935–36	Fred Mesmer	7–11	5–5	5th	
1936–37	Fred Mesmer	9–8	3–7	T–5th	
1937–38	Fred Mesmer	7–11	5–5	T–3rd	
Fred Mesmer:		53–76	22–34		
Elmer Ripley (Eastern Intercollegiate Conference) (1938–1939)
1938–39	Elmer Ripley	13–9	6–4	T–1st^{[Note B]}	
Elmer Ripley (Independent) (1939–1943)
1939–40	Elmer Ripley	8–10			
1940–41	Elmer Ripley	16–4			
1941–42	Elmer Ripley	9–11			
1942–43	Elmer Ripley	22–5			NCAA Runner-up
Elmer Ripley (1938–1943):		58–43	6–4		
Program suspended for World War II (1943–1945)
Ken Engles (Independent) (1945–1946)
1945–46	Ken Engles	11–9			
Ken Engles:		11–9			
Elmer Ripley (Independent) (1946–1949)
1946–47	Elmer Ripley	17–4			
1947–48	Elmer Ripley	13–15			
1948–49	Elmer Ripley	9–15			
Elmer Ripley (1946–1949):		41–37			
Elmer Ripley (overall):		133–82	6–4		
Buddy O'Grady (Independent) (1949–1952)
1949–50	Buddy O'Grady	12–12			
1950–51	Buddy O'Grady	8–14			
1951–52	Buddy O'Grady	15–10			
Buddy O'Grady:		35–36			
Buddy Jeannette (Independent) (1952–1956)
1952–53	Buddy Jeannette	13–7			NIT first round
1953–54	Buddy Jeannette	11–18			
1954–55	Buddy Jeannette	12–13			
1955–56	Buddy Jeannette	13–11			
Buddy Jeannette:		49–49			
Tom Nolan (Independent) (1956–1960)
1956–57	Tom Nolan	11–11			
1957–58	Tom Nolan	10–11			
1958–59	Tom Nolan	8–15			
1959–60	Tom Nolan	11–12			
Tom Nolan:		40–49			
Tommy O'Keefe (Independent) (1960–1966)
1960–61	Tommy O'Keefe	11–10			
1961–62	Tommy O'Keefe	14–9			
1962–63	Tommy O'Keefe	13–13			
1963–64	Tommy O'Keefe	15–10			
1964–65	Tommy O'Keefe	13–10			
1965–66	Tommy O'Keefe	16–8			
Tommy O'Keefe:		82–60			
John Magee (Independent) (1966–1972)
1966–67	John Magee	12–11			
1967–68	John Magee	11–12			
1968–69	John Magee	12–12			
1969–70	John Magee	18–7			NIT first round
1970–71	John Magee	12–14			
1971–72	John Magee	3–23			
John Magee:		69–79			
John Thompson, Jr. (Independent) (1972–1979)
1972–73	John Thompson, Jr.	12–14			
1973–74	John Thompson, Jr.	13–13			
1974–75	John Thompson, Jr.	18–10	^{[Note C]}		NCAA Division I first round
1975–76	John Thompson, Jr.	21–7	^{[Note C]}		NCAA Division I first round
1976–77	John Thompson, Jr.	19–9	^{[Note C]}		NIT first round
1977–78	John Thompson, Jr.	23–8	^{[Note C]}		NIT Fourth Place
1978–79	John Thompson, Jr.	24–5	^{[Note C]}		NCAA Division I first round
John Thompson, Jr. (Big East Conference (original)) (1979–1998)
1979–80	John Thompson, Jr.	26–6	5–1	T–1st	NCAA Division I Elite Eight
1980–81	John Thompson, Jr.	20–12	9–5	2nd	NCAA Division I first round
1981–82	John Thompson, Jr.	30–7	10–4	2nd	NCAA Division I Runner-up
1982–83	John Thompson, Jr.	22–10	11–5	2nd	NCAA Division I second round
1983–84	John Thompson, Jr.	34–3	14–2	1st^{[Note D]}	NCAA Division I champion
1984–85	John Thompson, Jr.	35–3	14–2	2nd	NCAA Division I Runner-up
1985–86	John Thompson, Jr.	24–8	11–5	3rd	NCAA Division I first round
1986–87	John Thompson, Jr.	29–5	12–4	T–1st	NCAA Division I Elite Eight
1987–88	John Thompson, Jr.	20–10	9–7	2nd	NCAA Division I second round
1988–89	John Thompson, Jr.	29–5	13–3	T–1st	NCAA Division I Elite Eight
1989–90	John Thompson, Jr.	24–7	11–5	2nd	NCAA Division I second round
1990–91	John Thompson, Jr.	19–13	8–8	4th	NCAA Division I second round
1991–92	John Thompson, Jr.	22–10	10–6	T–1st	NCAA Division I second round
1992–93	John Thompson, Jr.	20–13	8–10	5th	NIT Runner-up
1993–94	John Thompson, Jr.	19–12	10–8	T–4th	NCAA Division I second round
1994–95	John Thompson, Jr.	21–10	11–7	4th	NCAA Division I Sweet Sixteen
1995–96	John Thompson, Jr.	29–8	13–5	1st (BE7)^{[Note E]}	NCAA Division I Elite Eight
1996–97	John Thompson, Jr.	20–10	11–7	1st (BE7)^{[Note E]}	NCAA Division I first round
1997–98	John Thompson, Jr.	16–15	6–12	T–5th (BE7)^{[Note E]}	NIT second round
John Thompson, Jr./Craig Esherick (Big East Conference (original)) (1998–1999)
1998–99	John Thompson, Jr. Craig Esherick	15–16^{[Note F]}	6–12^{[Note F]}	10th	NIT first round
John Thompson, Jr.:		596–239	196–110		
Craig Esherick (Big East Conference (original)) (1999–2004)
1999–00	Craig Esherick	19–15	6–10	T–8th	NIT second round
2000–01	Craig Esherick	25–8	10–6	T–2nd (West)^{[Note G]}	NCAA Division I Sweet Sixteen
2001–02	Craig Esherick	19–11	9–7	T–3rd (West)^{[Note G]}	Declined NIT Invitation^{[Note H]}
2002–03	Craig Esherick	19–15	6–10	5th (West)^{[Note G]}	NIT Runner-up
2003–04	Craig Esherick	13–15	4–12	T–12th	
Craig Esherick:		103–74	41–53		
John Thompson III (Big East Conference (original)) (2004–2013)
2004–05	John Thompson III	19–13	8–8	T–7th	NIT Quarterfinal
2005–06	John Thompson III	23–10	10–6	T–4th	NCAA Division I Sweet Sixteen
2006–07	John Thompson III	30–7	13–3	1st	NCAA Division I Final Four
2007–08	John Thompson III	28–6	15–3	1st	NCAA Division I second round
2008–09	John Thompson III	16–15	7–11	11th	NIT first round
2009–10	John Thompson III	23–11	10–8	7th	NCAA Division I first round
2010–11	John Thompson III	21–11	10–8	8th	NCAA Division I first round
2011–12	John Thompson III	24–9	12–6	T–4th	NCAA Division I second round
2012–13	John Thompson III	25–7	14–4	T–1st	NCAA Division I first round
John Thompson III (Big East Conference) (2013–2017)
2013–14	John Thompson III	18–15	8–10	7th	NIT second round
2014–15	John Thompson III	22–11	12–6	T–2nd	NCAA Division I third round
2015–16	John Thompson III	15–18	7–11	8th	
2016–17	John Thompson III	14–18	5–13	9th	
John Thompson III:		278–151	131–97		
Patrick Ewing (Big East Conference) (2017–2023)
2017–18	Patrick Ewing	15–15	5–13	8th	
2018–19	Patrick Ewing	19–14	9–9	T–3rd	NIT first round
2019–20	Patrick Ewing	15–17	5–13	T–8th	Postseason cancelled^{[Note I]}
2020–21	Patrick Ewing	13–13	7–9	8th	NCAA Division I first round
2021–22	Patrick Ewing	6–25	0–19	11th	
2022–23	Patrick Ewing	7–25	2–18	11th	
Patrick Ewing:		75–109	28–81		
Ed Cooley (Big East Conference) (2023–present)
2023–24	Ed Cooley	9–23	2–18	10th	
2024–25	Ed Cooley	18–16	8–12	7th	Declined NIT invitation; Crown quarterfinal
2025–26	Ed Cooley	16–18	6–14	T-10th	
Ed Cooley:		43–57	16–44		
Total:		1,755–1,182			
National champion Postseason invitational champion Conference regular season champion Conference regular season and conference tournament champion Division regular season champion Division regular season and conference tournament champion Conference tournament champion

=== Season notes ===
^A. An elected student manager, Lou Murray, led the team during the 1906–07 season.
^B. The Eastern Intercollegiate Conference had no postseason tournament, but in previous seasons it had held a single-game playoff to determine the conference champion in the event of a first-place tie at the end of the regular season. At the end of the 1938–39 season, Georgetown and Carnegie Tech finished tied for first with identical 6–4 conference records, but no playoff game took place. Instead, the teams were declared conference co-champions.
^C. Although an independent, Georgetown participated from 1975 to 1979 in one of the regional end-of-season ECAC tournaments organized by the Eastern College Athletic Conference – a loosely organized sports federation of Eastern colleges and universities – for ECAC members which played as independents during the regular season. Each of these regional tournaments gave its winner an automatic bid to that year's NCAA tournament in the same manner as conference tournaments of conventional conferences. Georgetown played in the ECAC South Region Tournament from 1975 to 1977, winning it in 1975 and 1976, and in the ECAC South-Upstate Region Tournament in 1978 and 1979, winning it in 1979.
^D. In the 1983–1984 season, Georgetown won the Big East regular-season and 1984 Big East tournament championships in addition to the national championship.
^E. From the 1995–96 through 1997–98 seasons, the original Big East Conference was divided into the Big East 6 and Big East 7 divisions. Georgetown played in the Big East 7 Division during all three seasons.
^F. Thompson resigned at midseason on January 8, 1999 after going 7–6 overall and 0–4 in conference play. Craig Esherick immediately succeeded him as head coach, going 8–10 overall and 6–8 in conference play. Esherick led the team to a 10th-place conference finish, a first-round loss in the 1999 National Invitation Tournament, and an overall record of 15–16.
^G. From the 2000–01 through 2002–03 seasons, the original Big East Conference was divided into the East and West divisions. Georgetown played in the West Division during all three seasons.
^H. Georgetown declined an invitation to the 2002 National Invitation Tournament.
^I. Georgetown completed play in the 2020 Big East Men's Basketball Tournament, losing in the first round. The following day, the Big East Conference announced during halftime of the first game of the quarterfinals that the remainder of that game and the rest of the tournament had been cancelled due to the COVID-19 pandemic. The NCAA subsequently cancelled the 2020 NCAA Division I Men's Basketball Tournament and the 2020 National Invitation Tournament due to the COVID-19 pandemic.

=== Record summary ===
Totals (1906–2026)
Seasons: 118 (in 120 years)
Record

- Overall: 1,755–1,182, .598
- Eastern Intercollegiate Conference (1932–1939): 27–39, .409
- Big East Conference (1979–2013): 338–220, .606
- Big East Conference (2013–): 121–168, .419

Regular-Season Division Championships: 2

- Big East 7 Division (1995–1998): 2
- Big East West Division (2000–2003): 0

Regular-Season Conference Championships: 8

- Eastern Intercollegiate Conference (1932–1939): 1
- Big East Conference (1979–2013): 7
- Big East Conference (2013–): 0

Conference tournament championships:

- Eastern College Athletic Conference (ECAC) regional tournaments (1975–1979): 3 (Note: As an independent, Georgetown played annually from 1975 to 1979 in the ECAC regional basketball tournaments, winning in 1975, 1976, and 1979.)
- Big East Conference (1979–2013): 7
- Big East Conference (2013–): 1

NCAA tournament:

- Appearances: 31
- Final Four appearances: 5
- National championships: 1
- Overall record: 47–30, .610

National Invitation Tournament

- Appearances: 13
- Championships: 0
- Overall record: 15–14, .517

College Basketball Crown

- Appearances: 1
- Championships: 0
- Overall record: 1–1, .500

== Postseason tournament results ==
=== NCAA Tournament ===
Tournament	Seed	Results	Reference
1943	none (Note: The NCAA tournament did not begin seeding until 1979.)	National Runner-Up; Won Quarterfinal vs. New York University, 55–36; Won Semifinal vs. DePaul, 53–49; Lost Final vs. Wyoming, 34–46	
1975	none	First round Lost First Round vs. Central Michigan, 75–77	
1976	none	First round Lost First Round vs. #15 Arizona, 76–84	
1979	3	Second round Bye in First Round; Lost Second Round vs. #18 Rutgers, 58–64	
1980	3	East Region Semifinal; Bye in First Round; Won Second Round vs. Iona, 74–71; Won East Region Semifinal vs. #8 Maryland, 74–68; Lost East Region Final vs. Iowa, 80–81	
1981	7	First round Lost First Round vs. James Madison, 55–61	
1982	1	National Runner-Up; Bye in First Round; Won Second Round vs. Wyoming, 51–43; Won West Region Semifinal vs. #11 Fresno State, 58–40; Won West Region Final vs. #4 Oregon State, 69–45; Won National Semifinal vs. #20 Louisville, 50–46; Lost National Final vs. #1 North Carolina, 62–63	
1983	5	Second round Won First Round vs. Alcorn State, 68–63; Lost Second Round vs. #17 Memphis State, 57–66	
1984	1	National champions Bye in First Round; Won Second Round vs. Southern Methodist, 37–36; Won West Region Semifinal vs. #13 Nevada-Las Vegas, 62–48; Won West Region Final vs. Dayton, 61–49; Won National Semifinal vs. #3 Kentucky, 53–40; Won National Final vs. #5 Houston, 84–75	
1985	1	National Runner-Up; Won First Round vs. Lehigh, 68–43; Won Second Round vs. Temple, 68–46; Won East Region Semifinal vs. #14 Loyola, 65–53; Won East Region Final vs. #6 Georgia Tech, 60–54; Won National Semifinal vs. #2 St. John's, 77–59; Lost National Final vs. Villanova, 64–66	
1986	4	Second round Won First Round vs. Texas Tech, 70–64; Lost Second Round vs. Michigan State, 68–80	
1987	1	Southeast Region Runner-Up; Won First Round vs. Bucknell, 75–53; Won Second Round vs. Ohio State, 62–79; Won Southeast Region Semifinal vs. #20 Kansas, 70–57; Lost Southeast Region Final vs. Providence, 73–88	
1988	8	Second round Won First Round vs. Louisiana State, 66–63; Lost Second Round vs. #1 Temple, 53–74	
1989	1	East Region Runner-Up; Won First Round vs. Princeton, 50–49; Won Second Round vs. Notre Dame, 81–74; Won East Region Semifinal vs. #19 North Carolina State, 69–61; Lost East Region Final vs. #9 Duke, 77–85	
1990	3	Second round Won First Round vs. Texas Southern, 70–52; Lost Second Round vs. #25 Xavier, 71–74	
1991	8	Second round Won First Round vs. Vanderbilt, 70–60; Lost Second Round vs. #1 Nevada-Las Vegas, 54–62	
1992	6	Second round Won First Round vs. South Florida, 75–60; Lost Second Round vs. Florida State, 68–78	
1994	9	Second round Won First Round vs. Illinois, 84–77; Lost Second Round vs. Arkansas, 76–85	
1995	6	Southeast Region Semifinal; Won First Round vs. Xavier, 68–63; Won Second Round vs. Weber State, 53–51; Lost Southeast Region Semifinal vs. North Carolina, 64–74	
1996	2	East Region Runner-Up; Won First Round vs. Mississippi Valley State, 93–56; Won Second Round vs. New Mexico, 73–62; Won East Region Semifinal vs. Texas Tech, 98–90; Lost East Region Final vs. Massachusetts, 62–86	
1997	10	First round Lost First Round vs. North Carolina-Charlotte, 67–79	
2001	10	West Region Semifinal; Won First Round vs. Arkansas, 63–61; Won Second Round vs. Hampton, 76–57; Lost West Region Semifinal vs. #11 Maryland, 66–76	
2006	7	Minneapolis Region Semifinal; Won First Round vs. Northern Iowa, 54–49; Won Second Round vs. #6 Ohio State, 70–52; Lost Minneapolis Region Semifinal vs. #11 Florida, 53–57	
2007	2	Final Four; Won First Round vs. Belmont, 80–55; Won Second Round vs. Boston College, 62–55; Won East Region Semifinal vs. #23 Vanderbilt, 66–65; Won East Region Final vs. #4 North Carolina, 96–84 OT; Lost National Semifinal vs. #1 Ohio State, 60–67	
2008	2	Second round Won First Round vs. Maryland-Baltimore County, 66–47; Lost Second Round vs. Davidson, 70–74	
2010	3	First round Lost First Round vs. Ohio, 83–97	
2011	6	Second round (Note: The NCAA tournament officially called the opening round of play the "First Round" from 2011 to 2015. During these years, the "Round of 64," known before 2011 as the First Round, and the "Round of 32," known before 2011 as the Second Round, were called the "Second Round" and "Third Round," respectively. Beginning with the 2016 tournament, the opening round became known as the First Four, and the "Round of 64" and "Round of 32" reverted to the names First Round and Second Round, respectively.); Bye in First Round ("First Four"); Lost Second Round (of 64) vs. Virginia Commonwealth, 56–74	
2012	3	Third Round; Bye in First Round ("First Four"); Won Second Round (of 64) vs. Belmont, 74–59; Lost Third Round (of 32) vs. North Carolina State, 63–66	
2013	2	Second round Bye in First Round ("First Four'); Lost Second Round (of 64) vs. Florida Gulf Coast, 68–78	
2015	4	Third Round; Bye in First Round ("First Four"); Won Second Round (of 64) vs. Eastern Washington, 84–74; Lost Third Round (of 32) vs. Utah, 64–75	
2021	12	First round Lost First Round vs. #22 Colorado, 73–96	

=== National Invitation Tournament ===
Tournament	Seed	Results	Reference
1953	none (Note: The National Invitation Tournament did not begin seeding until 2006.)	First round Lost First Round vs. Louisville, 79–92	
1970	none	First round Lost First Round vs. Louisiana State, 82–83	
1977	none	First round Lost First Round vs. Virginia Tech, 79–83	
1978	none	Fourth Place; Won First Round vs. Virginia, 80–78 OT; Won Second Round vs. Dayton, 71–62; Lost Semifinal vs. North Carolina State, 85–86 OT; Lost Third-Place Game vs. Rutgers, 72–85	
1993	none	Runner-Up; Won First Round vs. Arizona State, 78–68; Won Second Round vs. Texas-El Paso, 71–44; Won Third Round vs. Miami (OH), 66–53; Won Semifinal vs. Alabama-Birmingham, 45–41; Lost Final vs. Minnesota, 61–62	
1998	none	Second round Won First Round vs. Florida, 71–69; Lost Second Round vs. Georgia Tech, 79–80 OT	
1999	none	First round Lost First Round vs. Princeton, 47–54	
2000	none	Second round Won First Round vs. Virginia, 115–111 3OT; Lost Second Round vs. California, 49–60	
2002	–	Declined Invitation	
2003	none	Runner-Up; Won First Round vs. Tennessee, 70–60; Won Second Round vs. Providence, 67–58; Won Quarterfinal vs. North Carolina, 79–74; Won Semifinal vs. Minnesota, 88–74; Lost Final vs. St. John's, 67–70	
2005	none	Quarterfinal; Won First Round vs. Boston University, 64–34; Won Second Round vs. Cal State Fullerton, 74–57; Lost Quarterfinal vs. South Carolina, 66–69	
2009	6	First round Lost First Round vs. Baylor, 72–74	
2014	4	Second round Won First Round vs. West Virginia, 77–65; Lost Second Round vs. Florida State, 90–101	
2019	3	First round Lost First Round vs. Harvard, 68–71	
2025	–	Declined Invitation (Note: Under an agreement between the Big East Conference and Fox Sports, Georgetown had a contractual obligation to decline its bid to the 2025 National Invitation Tournament. Under the agreement, Georgetown had the option of either participating in the 2025 College Basketball Crown instead or declining that bid as well. It chose to accept its bid to the 2025 College Basketball Crown.)	

=== College Basketball Crown ===
Tournament	Seed	Results	Reference
2025	none (Note: The College Basketball Crown does not use seeding.)	Quarterfinal; Won First Round vs. Washington State, 85–82; Lost Quarterfinal vs. Nebraska, 69–81	
