= 1940–41 Georgetown Hoyas men's basketball team =

American college basketball season

1940–41 Georgetown Hoyas men's basketball
- Conference: Independent
- Record: 16–4
- Head coach: Elmer Ripley (5th season)
- Captain: Irv Rizzi
- Home arena: Riverside Stadium

The 1940–41 Georgetown Hoyas men's basketball team represented Georgetown University during the 1940–41 NCAA college basketball season. Elmer Ripley coached it in his fifth of ten seasons as head coach; it was also the third season of his second of three stints at the helm. For the first time, the team played its home games at Riverside Stadium in Washington, D.C. It finished the season with a record of 16–4 and had no postseason play.

== Season recap ==
In its previous ten seasons, Georgetown had a combined record of 32 games under .500, and going into this season the Georgetown student yearbook, Ye Domesday Book, opined that the school would deemphasize or eliminate basketball by 1942 if the team's performance did not see significant improvement. The 1940–41 team rose to the yearbook's challenge, achieving the highest win total in history for a Georgetown men's basketball team.

Junior guard Buddy O'Grady returned for his second varsity season and led the team. He scored a season-high 14 points against Army.

Also starring for the team was sophomore center Bill Bornheimer. The tallest player in Georgetown history at the time at 6 feet 5 inches (196 cm), he had been the starting center of the freshman team the previous season and joined the varsity this year. A strong defender, rebounder, and inside shooter, he led the team in scoring, averaging 8.4 points per game. Before 7,000 fans at Riverside Stadium – a record home crowd for a Georgetown basketball game – he had a season-high 15 points as the Hoyas upset Temple 57–49 on February 10, 1941.

Following a season-opening loss, the Hoyas won 11 games in a row and then five of their last eight, finishing with a record of 16–4. They narrowly missed invitations to the NCAA tournament and National Invitation Tournament and had no postseason play.

== Roster ==
Two future Georgetown head coaches played on the team. Sophomore forward Ken Engles would leave school for World War II military service after the 1941-42 season, but would return to play for the 1945-46 team and also served as its head coach that season, the only player-coach in Georgetown men's basketball history. Junior guard Buddy O'Grady would coach the Hoyas from 1949 to 1952.

Junior guard Don Martin served as head coach at Boston College from 1953 to 1962.

#	Name	Height	Weight (lbs.)	Position	Class	Hometown	Previous Team(s)
3	Jim Kiernan	6'0"	N/A	F	Jr.	New York, NY, U.S.	Saint Simon High School
5	Charles Schmidli	6'4"	N/A	F	Jr.	West New York, NJ, U.S.	Memorial High School
7	Don Martin	5'8"	N/A	G	Jr.	Newport, RI, U.S.	La Salle Academy
8	Francis "Buddy" O'Grady	N/A	160	G	Jr.	New York, NY, U.S.	St. Peter's Boys High School
11	Russ Miller	N/A	N/A	F/C	Jr.	Passaic, NJ, U.S.	Passaic High School
12	Jim Giebel	N/A	N/A	G	Sr.	Bethesda, MD, U.S.	St. John's College High School (Washington, DC)
13	George Pajak	6'0"	N/A	G/F	Sr.	Ware, MA, U.S.	Ware Junior Senior High School
17	Ken Engles	6'2"	N/A	F	Jr.	Staten Island, NY, U.S.	Port Richmond High School
18	Bill Bornheimer	6'5"	200	C	So.	New Brunswick, NJ, U.S.	St. Peter's Preparatory School
20	Irv Rizzi	N/A	N/A	G	Sr.	West New York, NJ, U.S.	Memorial High School
24	Al Matuza	6'2"	N/A	F	Sr.	Shenandoah, PA, U.S.	Shenandoah High School

== 1940–41 schedule and results ==
Date time, TV	Opponent	Result	Record	Site (attendance) city, state
Regular Season
Thu., Dec. 5, 1940 no, no	at Loyola Maryland	L 32–36	0-1	Alumni Gymnasium (N/A); Baltimore, MD
Tue., Dec. 10, 1940 no, no	Western Maryland	W 41–29	1-1	Riverside Stadium (N/A); Washington, DC
Thu., Dec. 12, 1940 no, no	at American	W 41–35	2-1	Clendenen Gymnasium (N/A); Washington, DC
Mon., Dec. 16, 1940 no, no	George Washington	W 50–42	3-1	Riverside Stadium (N/A); Washington, DC
Wed., Dec. 18, 1940 no, no	at Loyola Chicago	W 38–35	4-1	Chicago Stadium (N/A); Chicago, IL
Wed, Jan. 8, 1941 no, no	at Canisius	W 53–35	5-1	Buffalo Memorial Auditorium (N/A); Buffalo, NY
Fri., Jan. 10, 1941 no, no	at Temple	W 46–45	6-1	Philadelphia Convention Hall (N/A); Philadelphia, PA
Wed., Jan 15, 1941 no, no	at Army	W 40–28	7-1	Hayes Gymnasium (N/A); West Point, NY
Thu., Jan. 16, 1941 no, no	New York University	W 36–27	8-1	Riverside Stadium (N/A); Washington, DC
Fri., Jan. 17, 1941 no, no	at Maryland	W 51–34	9-1	Ritchie Coliseum (N/A); College Park, MD
Wed., Jan. 22, 1941 no, no	at Navy	W 38–18	10-1	Dahlgren Hall (N/A); Annapolis, MD
Wed, Jan. 29, 1941 no, no	Penn State	W 28–24 ^{OT}	11-1	Riverside Stadium (N/A); Washington, DC
Wed., Feb. 5, 1941 no, no	at Syracuse; Rivalry	L 43–49	11-2	Archbold Gymnasium (N/A); Syracuse, NY
Thu., Feb. 6, 1941 no, no	at Colgate	W 39–36	12-2	Huntington Gymnasium (N/A); Hamilton, NY
Fri., Feb. 7, 1941 no, no	at Yale	W 41–39	13-2	Payne Whitney Gymnasium (N/A); New Haven, CT
Mon, Feb. 10, 1941 no, no	Temple	W 57–49	14-2	Riverside Stadium (7,000); Washington, DC
Wed., Feb. 19, 1941 no, no	at Penn State	L 38–45	14-3	Recreation Hall (N/A); State College, PA
Thu., Feb. 20, 1941 no, no	at Scranton	W 51–40	15-3	Watres Armory (N/A); Scranton, PA
Fri., Feb. 28, 1941 no, no	at Fordham	L 42–52	15-4	Madison Square Garden (N/A); New York, NY
Thu., Mar. 6, 1941 no, no	at George Washington	W 41–34	16-4	Riverside Stadium (N/A); Washington, DC
*Non-conference game. (#) Tournament seedings in parentheses.
