= 1942–43 Georgetown Hoyas men's basketball team =

American college basketball season

1942–43 Georgetown Hoyas men's basketball
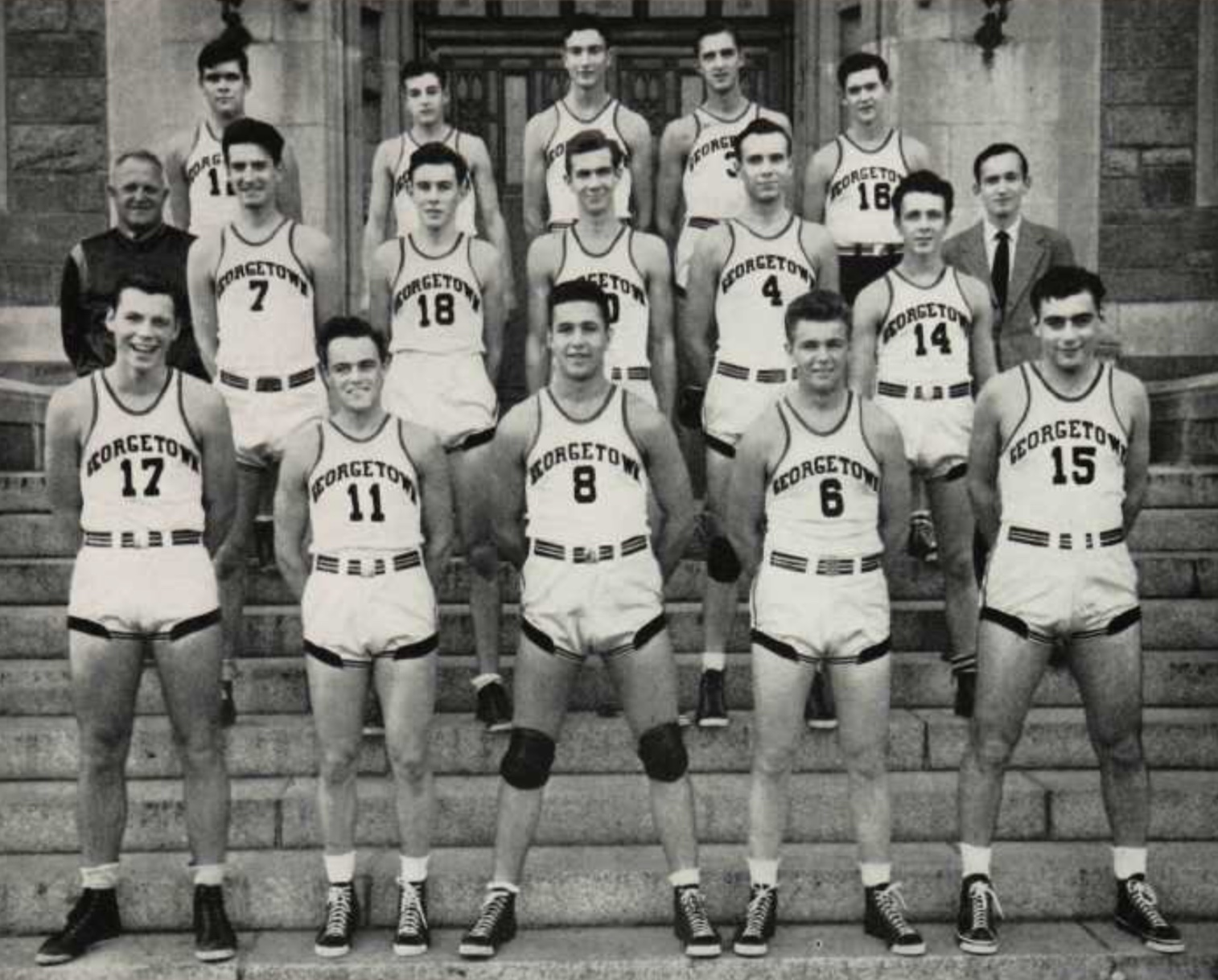
- 1943 edition of Ye Domesday Book

NCAA tournament, Runner-up

National Championship Game, L 34-46 vs. Wyoming
- Conference: Independent
- Record: 22–5 (.815)
- Head coach: Elmer Ripley (7th season)
- Captains: Dan Kraus; Billy Hassett
- Home arena: Tech Gymnasium

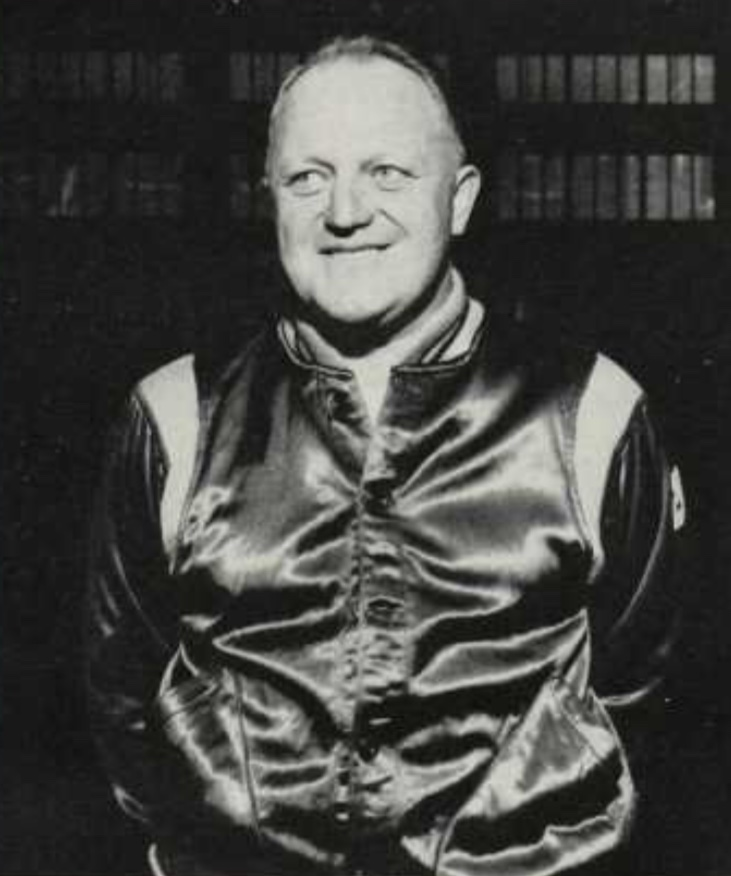
Georgetown head coach Elmer Ripley, from the 1943 edition of Ye Domesday Book.

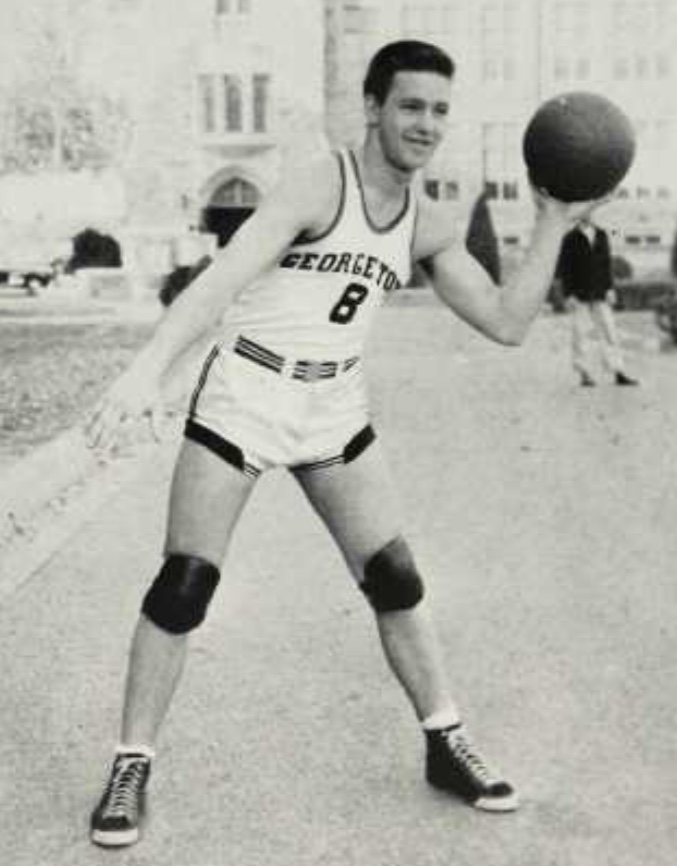
Guard Dan Kraus, from the 1943 edition of Ye Domesday Book.

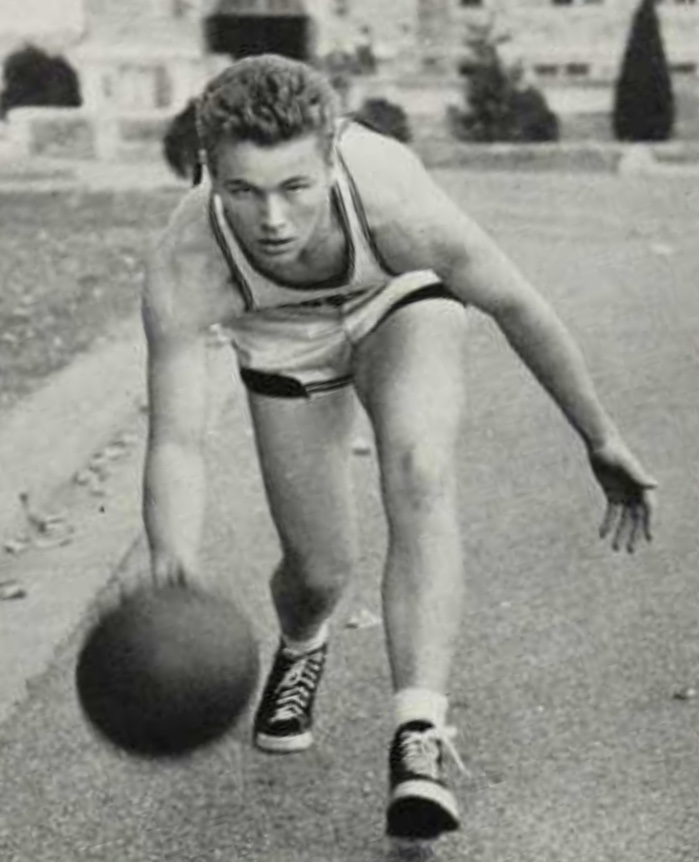
Guard Billy Hassett, from the 1943 edition of Ye Domesday Book.

The 1942–43 Georgetown Hoyas men's basketball team represented Georgetown University during the 1942–43 NCAA college basketball season. Elmer Ripley coached it in his seventh of ten seasons as head coach; it was also the fifth and final season of his second of three stints at the helm. The team returned to Tech Gymnasium – where Georgetown had played its home games from 1929 to 1940 – on the campus of McKinley Technical High School in Washington, D.C., for its home games. It finished with a record of 22–5 (.815) and became the first Georgetown team in history to participate in a post-season tournament, advancing to the final game of the NCAA tournament, losing to Wyoming. Its youth and inexperience led it to be nicknamed the "Kiddie Korps."

== Season recap ==
The previous season, Georgetown had posted a 9–11 record, after which all but three varsity players had either graduated or left school for military service in World War II. For 1942–43, Ripley fielded a young team consisting of three seniors, a junior, and ten sophomores (at a time when freshmen were ineligible for varsity play under National Collegiate Athletic Association (NCAA) rules), leading to the team being nicknamed the "Kiddie Korps." However, the sophomores were a particularly talented group Ripley had recruited primarily from the New York City area and had led the 1941–42 freshman team to a 20–1 record.

One of the talented sophomores to join the varsity from the freshman team this season was forward Andy Kostecka. In the season's second game, the 1942–43 squad became the first Georgetown team to score 100 or more points in a game when it defeated American 105–39 – a margin of victory no Georgetown team would exceed until the 1986–87 team beat Saint Leo 126–51 – and Kostecka scored a season-high 22 points in the game. He also had strong scoring performances against Temple, Catholic, Syracuse, and Penn State, and by the middle of the season led the team in scoring and was averaging 15 points per game. At the end of February 1943, Kostecka left school for World War II military service, not to return until the 1946–47 season, but he nonetheless was the team's second-highest scorer for the year.

Senior center Bill Bornheimer, who had starred for Georgetown the previous two seasons, would have played his senior year with the team this year, but the university had instituted an accelerated graduation schedule because of World War II, causing Bornheimer to graduate in January 1943 and lose eligibility for the 1942–43 season. Fortunately for the Hoyas, sophomore center John Mahnken joined the varsity from the freshman team, so impressing fellow sophomore center Sylvester "Stretch" Goedde with his talent that Goedde gave up hope of competing with Mahnken for playing time and left the team after three games to return to his native Ohio to pursue a minor-league baseball career. Mahnken scored 25 points against Syracuse and averaged 16 points per game in the later part of the season and 15.4 points per game overall.

One of the more notable games of the regular season came in January 1943 against the Quantico Marines, a United States Marine Corps team composed of former college players that was favored to beat the Hoyas. The Marines led through most of the game, but Georgetown mounted a comeback to close to 52–48 with two minutes left to play, at which point Ripley put talented sophomore point guard Dan Kraus into the game. Mahnken used a head fake to open up a shot for himself and then scored to make the score 52–50. The Marines did not score on their next possession, and sophomore Georgetown guard Jim "Miggs" Reily made a set shot to tie the game at 52–52. Kraus then stole the ball from Quantico on the Marines' final possession; with time running out, Ripley shouted "Shoot!", and Kraus scored on a 15-foot (4.6-meter) shot as time expired to give the Hoyas a 54–52 upset win. According to legend, the Marines were so angry over Kraus's steal and game-winning last-second basket that the Georgetown team required an armed escort after the game for protection.

On February 11, 1943, the Hoyas defeated longtime rival Fordham 52–39, their only victory over the Rams in 16 meetings between 1925 and 1952. The win completed a three-game homestand sweep that also included victories over Syracuse and Penn State, giving the Hoyas a 14–2 record and putting them in the running for their first NCAA tournament bid.

The team finished the regular season with a record of 19–4, and the NCAA selection committee chose Georgetown over Kentucky and Duke for one of the four Eastern bids in the 1943 NCAA tournament, while the National Invitation Tournament invited the Hoyas to play in the 1943 NIT — the first invitations to a post-season tournament in Georgetown men's basketball history. The Hoyas turned down the more regionally oriented NIT — at the time considered more prestigious than the NCAA Tournament — in order to play in the NCAA Tournament, which included teams from a larger geographic area and would give Hoya basketball true national exposure.

In the tournament quarterfinals at Madison Square Garden, Georgetown faced New York University, which had defeated the Hoyas 16 times in their last 21 meetings dating back to the 1921–1922 season and was the 2-to-1 favorite of New York City sportswriters, but Georgetown won in an upset, 55–36, with Mahnken scoring 18 points for the Hoyas. In the semifinals, the Hoyas were 3-to-1 underdogs to DePaul under first-year head coach Ray Meyer and led by their dominating center George Mikan. Following Ripley's strategy for the game, Kraus and Georgetown sophomore guard Billy Hassett kept Mikan busy in the middle while Hoya center Mahnken scored with outside shooting. The plan did succeed in allowing Georgetown to score but also left Mikan fairly free to score for DePaul at the other end; despite this, Georgetown closed to 28–23 when Hoya guard Lloyd Potolicchio scored on a 50-foot (15-meter) shot at the buzzer at the end of the first half. The Hoyas pulled ahead in the second half, but Mahnken fouled out with 10 minutes left. Ripley put Henry Hyde, seven inches shorter than Mikan, in to play center. Hyde managed to keep Mikan in check, and Georgetown upset DePaul 53–49, prompting a Hoya fan to shout "Believe it or not...by Ripley!", a quote which received wide publicity. Hassett, a very reliable passer and outside shooter for the Hoyas, had 11 points in the game.

Georgetown faced Wyoming, led by center Milo Komenich and forward Ken Sailors, in the final, which had a smaller crowd than expected because of the New York City's area's focus on the NIT championship run by St. John's; it was also the only NCAA championship game in history which was not filmed for posterity. Although Wyoming's defense held Mahnken to six points in the game, Georgetown led 31–26 with six minutes to play – but Wyoming then scored 11 straight points to take a 37–31 lead. The Hoyas closed to 37–34, but Wyoming finished the game with nine unanswered points to win 46–34 and take the championship. The following evening, as a fundraiser for the American Red Cross, the finalists of the NCAA Tournament and NIT took part in the Sportswriters Invitational Playoff, in which the two tournament champions, Wyoming and St. John's, and the two runners-up, Georgetown and Toledo, played each other. The NCAA Tournament teams prevailed in both: Wyoming beat St. John's 52–47, and the Hoyas defeated Toledo 54–40 to close out the season. The Hoyas finished with a record of 22–5, the most wins in team history and the first time a Georgetown team won 20 or more games. No Georgetown team won as many games for 35 years, until the 1977–1978 team won 23.

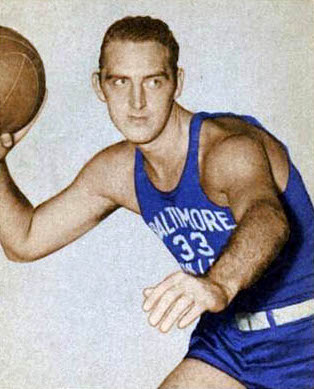
Former Hoya center John Mahnken as a professional with the Baltimore Bullets of the Basketball Association of America in 1948.

The performance of the "Kiddie Korps" raised hopes for an extended period of college basketball success for Georgetown. Later in 1943, however, the school suspended all of its athletic programs for the duration of World War II. With no basketball team to coach, Ripley left Georgetown to coach at Columbia, and the collegiate careers of many of Georgetown's players came to an end. Mahnken served in the military, then pursued a professional basketball career instead of returning to Georgetown. Hassett transferred to Notre Dame and completed his college basketball career there.

Georgetown would have no basketball program during the 1943–44 and 1944–45 seasons. After World War II ended in August 1945, the school would resume athletic competition and put together a varsity men's basketball team for the 1945–46 season. After two years at Columbia, Ripley had committed to coach Notre Dame in 1945–46, and those Georgetown players from the 1942–43 team retaining eligibility to play – notably Kostecka, Kraus, Potolicchio, and Reilly – had not yet returned from military service. Georgetown would field a virtually all-walk-on team in 1945–46, and Ripley and his eligible players from 1942 to 1943 would not return to Georgetown until the 1946–47 season.

The Hoyas would not appear in a postseason tournament again until the 1952–1953 team played in the NIT in 1953, and they would not take part in the NCAA tournament again until the 1974–1975 team played in the 1975 tournament. The 1942–1943 team was the only Georgetown men's team to win a game in a post-season tournament until the 1977–1978 team's fourth-place finish in the 1978 NIT, and the only one to win a game in the NCAA Tournament until the 1979–1980 team reached the East Region final of the 1980 NCAA tournament. Georgetown would not appear in the Final Four or the NCAA Tournament championship game again until the 1981–1982 team finished as the national runner-up in 1982.

== Roster ==
After World War II military service, sophomore guards Dan Kraus, Lloyd Potolicchio, and "Miggs" Reilly and sophomore forward Andy Kostecka all returned to play on the 1946–47 team. Junior guard Bob Duffey was killed in action in Germany on November 13, 1944, during his World War II service.

Sophomore center-forward Henry Hyde later became a 16-term United States Congressman from Illinois, representing the state's 6th Congressional District in the United States House of Representatives from 1975 to 2007.

#	Name	Height	Weight (lbs.)	Position	Class	Hometown	Previous Team(s)
3	John Mahnken	6'9"	215	C	So.	West New York, New Jersey	Memorial High School
4	Andy Kostecka	6'3"	200	F	So.	Bloomfield, New Jersey	Saint Benedict's Preparatory School
5	Lloyd Potolicchio	5'10"	N/A	G	So.	Staten Island, New York	Curtis HS
6	Billy Hassett	6'1"	180	G	So.	New York City, New York	La Salle Academy
7	Henry Hyde	6'3"	N/A	F/C	So.	Chicago, Illinois	St. George HS
8	Dan Kraus	6'0"	175	G	So.	New York City, New York	DeWitt Clinton HS
9	Sylvester "Stretch" Goedde	6'8"	N/A	C	So.	Vaughnsville, Ohio	Vaughnsville HS
10	Bill Feeny	N/A	N/A	G	So.	New York City, New York	N/A
11	Jim "Miggs" Reilly	5'6"	N/A	G	So.	New York City, New York	St. Peter's Boys HS
12	Lane O'Donnell	N/A	N/A	F	Sr.	Washington, D.C.	Gonzaga College HS
13	Bob Duffey	N/A	N/A	G	Jr.	N/A	N/A
15	Dan Gabbianelli	N/A	N/A	F	Sr.	Weehawken, New Jersey	Weehawken HS
16	Ed Lavin	N/A	N/A	F	So.	N/A	N/A
17	Frank Finnerty	N/A	N/A	F	Sr.	Montclair, New Jersey	Blair Academy

== 1942–43 schedule and results ==
It was common practice at this time for colleges and universities to include non-collegiate opponents in their schedules, with the games recognized as part of their official record for the season, and the games played against United States Army teams from Aberdeen Proving Ground and Fort Lee, a United States Navy team from Norfolk Naval Base, and a United States Marine Corps team from Marine Corps Base Quantico therefore counted as part of Georgetown's won-loss record for 1942–43. It was not until 1952, after the completion of the 1951–52 season, that the National Collegiate Athletic Association (NCAA) ruled that colleges and universities could no longer count games played against non-collegiate opponents in their annual won-loss records.

Date time, TV	Opponent	Result	Record	Site (attendance) city, state
Regular Season
Tue., Dec. 8, 1942	Western Maryland	W 75–34	1–0	Tech Gymnasium; Washington, D.C.
Thu., Dec. 10, 1942	at American	W 105–39	2–0	Clendenen Gymnasium; Washington, D.C.
Mon., Dec. 14, 1942	Aberdeen Proving Ground	W 48–39	3–0	Tech Gymnasium; Washington, D.C.
Fri., Jan. 1, 1943	Scranton	W 58–43	4–0	Tech Gymnasium; Washington, D.C.
Sat., Jan. 2, 1943	St. Bonaventure	W 56–41	5–0	Tech Gymnasium; Washington, D.C.
Wed., Jan. 6, 1943	George Washington	W 55–41	6–0	Tech Gymnasium; Washington, D.C.
Fri. Jan. 8, 1943	at Camp Lee	W 49–31	7–0	Camp Lee Gymnasium; Petersburg, Virginia
Sat., Jan. 9, 1943	at Norfolk Naval Base	L 42–57	7–1	Norfolk Base Gymnasium; Naval Station Norfolk, Virginia
Mon., Jan. 11, 1943	at Quantico Marines	W 54–52	8–1	Quantico Gymnasium; MCB Quantico, Virginia
Wed., Jan. 13, 1943	Temple	L 51–52	8–2	Tech Gymnasium; Washington, D.C.
Sat., Jan. 16, 1943	Catholic	W 71–45	9–2	Tech Gymnasium; Washington, D.C.
Wed., Jan. 20, 1943	Loyola Maryland	W 68–42	10–2	Tech Gymnasium; Washington, D.C.
Sat., Jan. 23, 1943	at Army	W 54–35	11–2	Hayes Gymnasium; West Point, New York
Mon., Feb. 1, 1943	Syracuse; Rivalry	W 65–38	12–2	Tech Gymnasium; Washington, D.C.
Thu., Feb. 4, 1943	Penn State	W 51–35	13–2	Tech Gymnasium; Washington, D.C.
Thu., Feb. 11, 1943	Fordham	W 52–39	14–2	Tech Gymnasium; Washington, D.C.
Sat., Feb. 20, 1943	at Maryland	W 46–36	15–2	Ritchie Coliseum; College Park, Maryland
Mon., Feb. 22, 1943	at St. John's	L 43–65	15–3	Madison Square Garden; New York City
Sat., Feb. 27, 1943	at Temple	W 46–40	16–3	Philadelphia Convention Hall; Philadelphia
Mon., Mar. 1, 1943	at George Washington	W 53–30	17–3	Tech Gymnasium; Washington, D.C.
Wed., Mar. 3, 1943	at Colgate	W 73–59	18–3	Huntington Gymnasium; Hamilton, New York
Thu., Mar. 4, 1943	at Syracuse; Rivalry	W 47–46	19–3	Archbold Gymnasium; Syracuse, New York
Sat., Mar. 6, 1943	at Penn State	L 37–55	19–4	Recreation Hall; State College, Pennsylvania
NCAA tournament
Wed., Mar. 24, 1943	vs. New York University; Quarterfinal	W 55–36	20-4	Madison Square Garden; New York City
Thu., Mar. 25, 1943	vs. DePaul; Semifinal	W 53–49	21-4	Madison Square Garden (14,085); New York City
Tue., Mar. 30, 1943	vs. Wyoming; Final	L 34–46	21–5	Madison Square Garden (13,206); New York City
Sportswriters Invitational Playoff
Wed., Mar. 31, 1943	vs. Toledo	W 54–40	22–5	Madison Square Garden (18,316); New York City
*Non-conference game. (#) Tournament seedings in parentheses.
