= 1947–48 Georgetown Hoyas men's basketball team =

American college basketball season

1947–48 Georgetown Hoyas men's basketball
- Conference: Independent
- Record: 13–15
- Head coach: Elmer Ripley (9th season)
- Captain: Andy Kostecka
- Home arena: D.C. Armory

The 1947–48 Georgetown Hoyas men's basketball team represented Georgetown University during the 1947–48 NCAA college basketball season. Elmer Ripley coached it in his ninth season as head coach, the second season of his third stint at the helm. The team was an independent and for the first time played its home games at the D.C. Armory in Washington, D.C. Georgetown finished with a record of 13–15 and had no post season play.

== Season recap ==
The 1946–47 team had won 19 games, and all five of its starters returned this year, including forward Andy Kostecka, a star of the 1942–43 team and – after World War II military service – of the 1946–47 team. Hopes were high that the 1947–48 squad would take the Hoyas back to the NCAA tournament for the first time since 1943, when Ripley had coached them to the national final in their only tournament appearance thus far. The team won its first six games, with Kostecka averaging 22 points per game during the first four, one of which was an overtime win over St. John's at Madison Square Garden in New York City - Georgetown's only win over the Redmen in 17 games played between 1931 and 1973. Kostecka suffered a leg injury in the fifth game, against Virginia Tech, and missed the sixth and seventh games of the season.

After a 6–1 start, the Hoyas embarked on a road trip on December 24, 1947, that took them to six games spread across Louisiana, Kentucky, Missouri, Illinois, and Indiana. The trip was controversial because of its length, the tight schedule of games – including four games in five nights requiring 300 miles (483 km) of travel – and the requirement for the players to be on the road during Christmas, but Ripley believed that it would allow the Georgetown program to gain national recognition by playing Louisville, Notre Dame, and Saint Louis. The trip, which lasted through January 5, 1948, wore the players down; Kostecka, for example, had averaged 17 points per game before the trip but managed only half that during it, although his 11 points against Notre Dame in the last game of the trip made him Georgetown's top scorer in history. Georgetown lost all six games to fall to 6–7 on the season. Following the trip, the Washington Times-Herald newspaper reported dissension between Ripley and Kostecka over the trip; both denied it, but Kostecka was dismissed from the team after the article appeared.

With top scorer Kostecka off the team, Georgetown struggled through its next 10 games in a tough national schedule, winning only three of them. Senior guard Dan Kraus, like Kostecka a star of the successful 1942–43 and 1946–47 teams, had been a defensive specialist during his career, but he stepped into the breach on offense, scoring 14 against New York University, 12 at Penn State, and 13 at Villanova. Junior guard Tommy O'Keefe scored 50 points over one three-game stretch and in double figures nine times, including 14 against Penn State and 20 against George Washington, and ended the season as the Hoyas' leading scorer. Falling to 9–14 with five games to play, Georgetown managed to win four of the remaining games to finish with a record of 13–15. The team's disappointing final record meant no post-season play.

The unremarkable 1947–48 season heralded the beginning of a mostly undistinguished quarter-century of men's basketball at Georgetown. Although the team would appear in the National Invitation Tournament in 1953 and 1970, between the 1947–48 season and the end of the 1971–72 season, Georgetown would have an overall record under .500, and its total of 296 wins during those 25 seasons would be the lowest among the 32 Catholic universities playing Division I college basketball in the United States. It would have no NCAA tournament appearances during these seasons; in fact, after appearing in the NCAA tournament in 1943, it would not make the tournament again until 1975.

== Roster ==
Junior guard Tommy O'Keefe would later serve as Georgetown's assistant coach for four seasons from 1956 to 1960 and as head coach for six seasons from 1960 to 1966.

#	Name	Height	Weight (lbs.)	Position	Class	Hometown	Previous Team(s)
4	Andy Kostecka	6'3"	200	F	Sr.	Bloomfield, NJ, U.S.	Saint Benedict's Preparatory School
8	Dan Kraus	6'0"	175	G	Sr.	New York, NY, U.S.	DeWitt Clinton HS
9	Italo Ablondi	6'0"	N/A	G	So.	New York, NY, U.S.	Stuyvesant HS
13	Dick Falvey	6'0"	N/A	G	So.	New York, NY, U.S.	La Salle Academy
15	Ken "Bud" Brown	6'4"	N/A	C	Sr.	Muncie, IN, U.S.	Burris Laboratory School
16	Tommy O'Keefe	6'0"	180	G	Jr.	Jersey City, NJ, U.S.	University of Notre Dame
17	Ray Corley	6'2"	180	F	Jr.	New York, NY, U.S.	La Salle Academy; University of Notre Dame
24	Eddie Brembs	6'4"	N/A	F	Sr.	New York, NY, U.S.	N/A
26	Vin Leddy	5'11"	N/A	G	Jr.	New York, NY, U.S.	Saint Francis High School
35	Johnny Brown	6'3"	N/A	C/F	So.	Staten Island, NY, U.S.	Tottenville, NY
36	Frank Alagia	6'1"	N/A	F	So.	New York, NY, U.S.	Andrew Jackson HS|33
N/A	Joe Culhane	N/A	N/A	G	Jr.	Rochester, NY, U.S.	University of Rochester

== 1947–48 schedule and results ==
It was common practice at this time for colleges and universities to include non-collegiate opponents in their schedules, with the games recognized as part of their official record for the season, and the game played against a United States Marine Corps team from Marine Corps Base Quantico, Virginia, on December 16, 1947, therefore counted as part of Georgetown's won-loss record for 1947–48. It was not until 1952 after the completion of the 1951–52 season that the National Collegiate Athletic Association (NCAA) ruled that colleges and universities could no longer count games played against non-collegiate opponents in their annual won-loss records.

Date time, TV	Opponent	Result	Record	Site city, state
Regular Season
Tue., Dec. 7, 1947 no, no	Denver	W 64–60 ^{OT}	1-0	D.C. Armory; Washington, DC
Thu., Dec. 11, 1947 no, no	Loyola Chicago	W 54–45	2-0	D.C. Armory; Washington, DC
Sat., Dec. 13, 1947 no, no	at St. John's	W 61–58 ^{OT}	3-0	Madison Square Garden; New York, NY
Tue., Dec. 16, 1947 no, no	vs. Quantico Marines	W 61–56	4-0	Brookland Gymnasium; Washington, DC
Fri., Dec. 19, 1947 no, no	vs. Virginia Tech	W 66–51	5-0	Brookland Gymnasium; Washington, DC
Sat., Dec. 20, 1947 no, no	at Richmond	W 64–54	6-0	Richmond Arena; Richmond, VA
Tue., Dec. 23, 1947 no, no	Santa Clara	L 39–45	6-1	D.C. Armory; Washington, DC
Wed., Dec. 24, 1947 no, no	at Loyola New Orleans	L 53–65	6-2	Loyola Gymnasium; New Orleans, LA
Tue., Dec. 30, 1947 no, no	at Saint Louis	L 58–63	6-3	Kiel Auditorium; St. Louis, MO
Thu., Jan. 1, 1948 no, no	at Louisville	L 52–69	6-4	N/A; Louisville, KY
Fri., Jan. 2, 1948 no, no	at Western Kentucky	L 37–58	6-5	Health & Phys Ed Building; Bowling Green, KY
Sun., Jan. 4, 1948 no, no	at Loyola Chicago	L 41–53	6-6	Alumni Gymnasium; Chicago, IL
Mon., Jan. 5, 1948 no, no	at Notre Dame	L 69–77	6-7	Notre Dame Fieldhouse; Notre Dame, IN
Wed., Jan. 7, 1948 no, no	Maryland	W 52–40	7-7	D.C. Armory; Washington, DC
Sat., Jan. 10, 1948 no, no	at Canisius	L 39–40	7-8	Buffalo Memorial Auditorium; Buffalo, NY
Mon., Jan. 12, 1948 no, no	at George Washington	W 51–43	8-8	D.C. Armory; Washington, DC
Sat., Jan. 17, 1948 no, no	La Salle	L 35–48	8-9	D.C. Armory; Washington, DC
Sat., Jan. 24, 1948 no, no	Texas Wesleyan	W 48–37	9-9	D.C. Armory; Washington, DC
Tue., Feb. 3, 1948 no, no	at Holy Cross	L 51–75	9-10	Boston Garden; Boston, MA
Sun., Feb. 8, 1948 no, no	North Carolina State	L 46–87	9-11	Reynolds Coliseum; Raleigh, NC
Wed., Feb. 11, 1948 no, no	Penn State	L 40–42	9-12	D.C. Armory; Washington, DC
Sat., Feb. 14, 1948 no, no	New York University	L 58–74	9-13	D.C. Armory; Washington, DC
Tue., Feb. 17, 1948 no, no	Fordham	L 50–51	9-14	D.C. Armory; Washington, DC
Sat., Feb. 21, 1948 no, no	George Washington	W 41–38	10-14	D.C. Armory; Washington, DC
Wed., Feb. 25, 1948 no, no	Villanova	W 64–46	11-14	D.C. Armory; Washington, DC
Wed., Mar. 3, 1948 no, no	at Penn State	W 49–43	12-14	Recreation Hall; State College, PA
Thu., Mar. 4, 1948 no, no	at Villanova	L 56–71	12-15	Villanova Field House; Villanova, PA
Sun., Mar. 7, 1948 no, no	vs. Boston College	W 65–46	13-15	69th Regiment Armory; New York, NY
*Non-conference game. (#) Tournament seedings in parentheses.
