= 1941–42 Georgetown Hoyas men's basketball team =

American college basketball season

1941–42 Georgetown Hoyas men's basketball
- Conference: Independent
- Record: 9–11
- Head coach: Elmer Ripley (6th season)
- Captain: Francis "Buddy" O'Grady
- Home arena: Riverside Stadium

The 1941–42 Georgetown Hoyas men's basketball team represented Georgetown University during the 1941–42 NCAA college basketball season. Elmer Ripley coached it in his sixth of ten seasons as head coach; it was also the fourth season of his second of three stints at the helm. For the second straight year, the team played its home games at Riverside Stadium in Washington, D.C., the last season in which Georgetown played home games there. It played an upgraded national schedule this season and struggled, finishing with a record of 9–11, and had no postseason play.

== Season recap ==
Senior guard Francis "Buddy" O'Grady, who had led the team through challenging seasons the previous two years, had another good season, averaging a career-high 8.8 points per game for the year. Of O'Grady's departure due to graduation at the end of this season, the Georgetown student yearbook, Ye Domesday Book, wrote, "In Buddy O'Grady, Georgetown loses one of the greatest basketball players ever to trod on the Ryan Gym [Georgetown's practice facility] floor, and there have been many," adding that over his years "he has undoubtedly been the best basketball player in the District of Columbia."

Junior center Bill Bornheimer, who had starred for Georgetown the previous year, scored 23 points against American in the second game of the season. Opposing teams soon learned to play a defense that contained Bornheimer in the middle, and he only scored in double figures one more time, although his 8.0 point-per-game average was only slightly lower than his 8.4 points per game of the previous season. He also provided a strong defensive presence and was an important rebounder for the team. Georgetown would institute an accelerated graduation program the following season because of World War II, causing him to graduate in January 1943 and making him ineligible for varsity play in 1942–43, so he did not return to the team during his senior year. His 8.2-point-per-game average over his two-year collegiate career, however, was the second-highest career average by a Georgetown player between 1928 and 1942, exceeded only by guard Ed Hargaden's 9.8 points-per-game career average between 1932 and 1935.

The Hoyas' challenging schedule – which included highly regarded teams such as Long Island University, Marquette, and DePaul – and the focus of opponents on limiting Bornheimer's scoring opportunities caused the team to struggle to a 9–11 finish. It had no post-season play.

The United States entered World War II when the Japanese attacked Pearl Harbor on December 7, 1941, at the beginning of the season. After the season ended, all but three of the players graduated or left school to enter military service. Ripley thus had to rely on a team nicknamed the "Kiddie Korps," made up mostly of sophomores, the following season.

== Roster ==
Junior forward Ken Engles left school for military service after this season but returned to play for the 1945–46 team, and also served as its head coach that season, the only player-coach in Georgetown men's basketball history. Engles was one of two future Georgetown head coaches on the 1941–42 squad; the other was senior guard Buddy O'Grady, who coached the Hoyas from 1949 to 1952.

Senior guard Don Martin served as head coach at Boston College from 1953 to 1962.

#	Name	Height	Weight (lbs.)	Position	Class	Hometown	Previous Team(s)
3	Dan Gabbianelli	N/A	N/A	F	Jr.	Weehawken, NJ, U.S.	Weehawken High School
4	John Dieckelman (or Dieckleman)	6'0"	N/A	G	Sr.	Albany, NY, U.S.	Vincentian High School
5	Charles Schmidli	6'4"	N/A	F	Sr.	West New York, NJ, U.S.	Memorial High School
7	Don Martin	5'8"	N/A	G	Sr.	Newport, RI, U.S.	La Salle Academy
8	Francis "Buddy" O'Grady	N/A	160	G	Sr.	New York, NY, U.S.	St. Peter's Boys High School
9	Frank Cleary	6'0"	N/A	F/C	Sr.	Somerville, NJ, U.S.	Somerville High School
12	Lane O'Donnell	N/A	N/A	F	Jr.	Washington, DC, U.S.	Gonzaga College High School
15	Al Lujack	6'3"	N/A	F	Sr.	Connellsville, PA, U.S.	Connellsville High School
16	Frank Finnerty	N/A	N/A	F	Sr.	Montclair, NJ, U.S.	Blair Academy
17	Ken Engles	6'2"	N/A	F	Jr.	Staten Island, NY, U.S.	Port Richmond High School
18	Bill Bornheimer	6'5"	200	C	Jr.	New Brunswick, NJ, U.S.	St. Peter's Preparatory School

== 1941–42 schedule and results ==
Date time, TV	Opponent	Result	Record	Site city, state
Regular Season
N/A no, no	Western Maryland	W 66–43	1-0	Riverside Stadium; Washington, DC
N/A no, no	at American	W 76–33	2-0	Clendenen Gymnasium; Washington, DC
N/A no, no	at Temple	L 34–35	2-1	Philadelphia Convention Hall; Philadelphia, PA
N/A no, no	at Fordham	L 31–33	2-2	Rose Hill Gymnasium; Bronx, NY
N/A no, no	at Long Island University	L 38–46	2-3	Madison Square Garden; New York, NY
N/A no, no	Temple	W 42–40	3-3	Riverside Stadium; Washington, DC
N/A no, no	at George Washington	L 36–45	3-4	Riverside Stadium; Washington, DC
N/A no, no	Maryland	L 42–51	3-5	Riverside Stadium; Washington, DC
N/A no, no	at Army	W 44–32	4-5	Hayes Gymnasium; West Point, NY
N/A no, no	at Colgate	W 55–39	5-5	Huntington Gymnasium; Hamilton, NY
N/A no, no	at Syracuse	L 44–55	5-6	Archbold Gymnasium; Syracuse, NY
N/A no, no	at Marquette	W 35–34	6-6	Chicago Stadium; Chicago, IL
N/A no, no	at St. Joseph's	L 35–58	6-7	Philadelphia Convention Hall; Philadelphia, PA
N/A no, no	Duquesne	L 35–40	6-8	Riverside Stadium; Washington, DC
N/A no, no	at Loyola Maryland	W 41–34	7-8	Alumni Gymnasium; Baltimore, MD
N/A no, no	at Scranton	L 38–40	7-9	Watres Armory; Scranton, PA
N/A no, no	at Yale	W 55–53	8-9	Payne Whitney Gymnasium; New Haven, CT
N/A no, no	at Navy	L 36–51	8-10	Dahlgren Hall; Annapolis, MD
N/A no, no	DePaul	L 29–34	8-11	Riverside Stadium; Washington, DC
N/A no, no	George Washington	W 52–42	9-11	Riverside Stadium; Washington, DC
*Non-conference game. (#) Tournament seedings in parentheses.
