= 1943 NCAA basketball championship game =

1943 NCAA Tournament Championship Game
National championship game
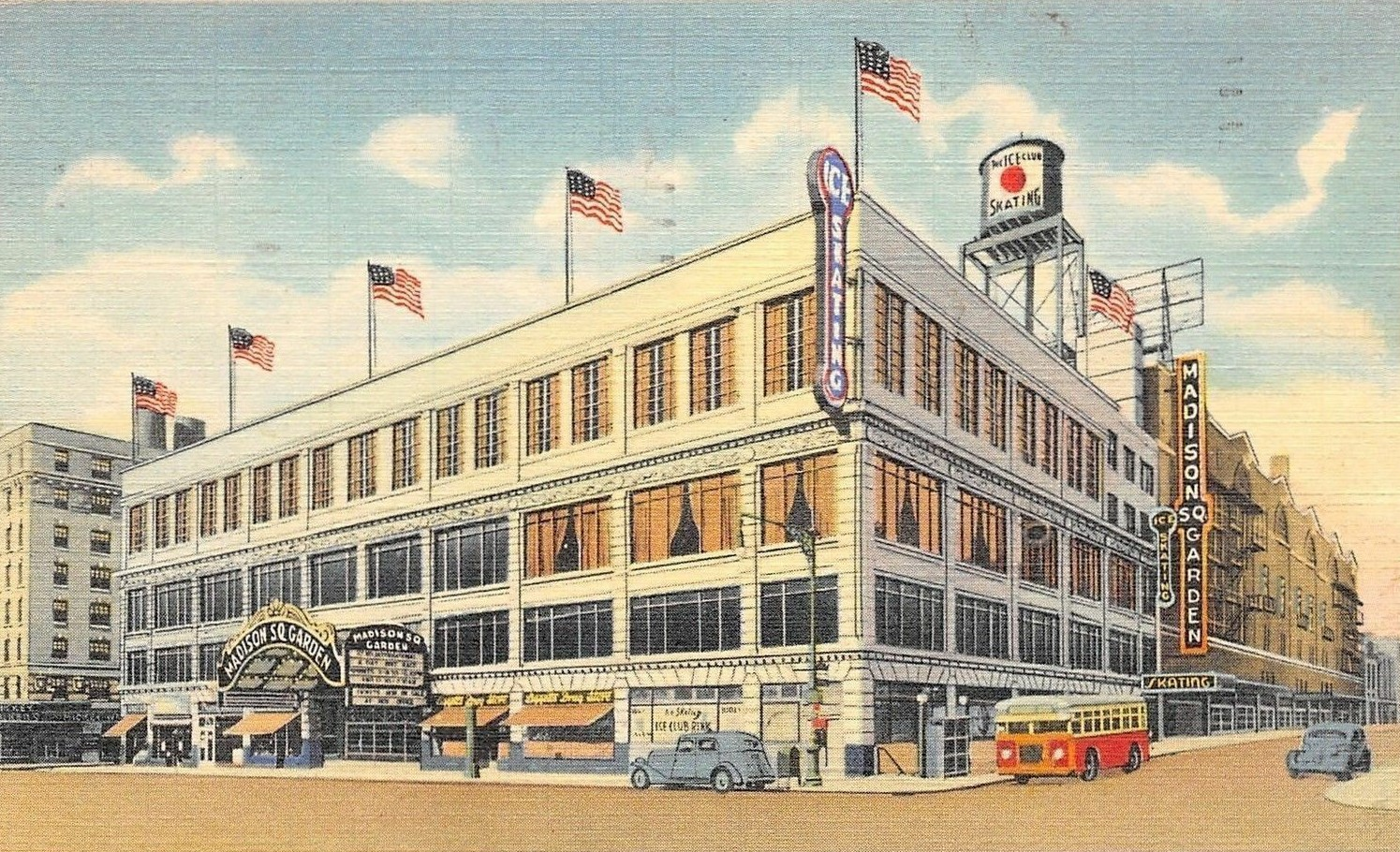
- Madison Square Garden in New York City hosted the championship game.
Wyoming Cowboys	Georgetown Hoyas
MSC	Independent
(30-2)	(22-4)
46	34
Head coach: Everett Shelton	Head coach: Elmer Ripley
	1st half	2nd half	Total
Wyoming Cowboys	13	33	46
Georgetown Hoyas	16	18	34
- Date: March 30, 1943
- Venue: Madison Square Garden, New York City, New York
- MVP: Ken Sailors, Wyoming

The 1943 NCAA University Division Basketball Championship Game was the finals of the 1943 NCAA basketball tournament and it determined the national champion for the 1942-43 NCAA men's basketball season. The game was played on March 30, 1943, at Madison Square Garden in New York City. It featured the Wyoming Cowboys of the Mountain States Conference, and the independent Georgetown Hoyas.

== Participating teams ==
=== Wyoming Cowboys ===
- West
  - Wyoming 53, Oklahoma 50
- Final Four
  - Wyoming 58, Texas 54

=== Georgetown Hoyas ===
- East
  - Georgetown 55, NYU 36
- Final Four
  - Georgetown 53, DePaul 49

== Game summary ==
March 30, 1943

Wyoming Cowboys 46, Georgetown Hoyas 34
Scoring by half: 13-16, 33-18
Pts: Ken Sailors 16	Pts: Bill Feeny 8

Madison Square Garden, New York City

== Aftermath ==
This was Georgetown's last appearance in the championship game until 1982, where they would lose to a Michael Jordan-led North Carolina team. They would eventually win the national championship in 1984, defeating Houston.
