= 1946–47 Georgetown Hoyas men's basketball team =

American college basketball season

1946–47 Georgetown Hoyas men's basketball
- Conference: Independent
- Record: 19–7
- Head coach: Elmer Ripley (8th season)
- Captain: Dan Kraus
- Home arena: Uline Arena

The 1946–47 Georgetown Hoyas men's basketball team represented Georgetown University during the 1946–47 NCAA college basketball season. Elmer Ripley returned to coach it in the first season of his third stint as head coach, his eighth overall season as the Hoyas' head coach. The team was an independent and for the first time played its home games at Uline Arena in Washington, D.C., although because of conflicts at Uline Arena it played four home games on the campus of The Catholic University of America at Brookland Gymnasium, which had been its home court the previous season.

Ripley previously had coached Georgetown from 1927 to 1929, leaving to coach Yale for six seasons, and again from 1938 to 1943, leading the Hoyas to what at the time was their only postseason tournament appearance in the 1943 NCAA Tournament. He then left to coach at Columbia and Notre Dame when Georgetown suspended its basketball program for two seasons during World War II. This time he would coach the Hoyas for three seasons, and the 1946–47 team was by far the most successful of his third stint as Georgetown's coach.

== Season recap ==
With neither Ripley nor the varsity players of 1942–43 available the previous season, Georgetown had fielded a virtually all-walk-on team in 1945–46 with its only veteran player, Ken Engles, serving as player-coach. None of those players returned for 1946–47 except for junior guard George Benigni; instead, the returning Ripley brought back those members of the nucleus of the 1942–43 team who still had eligibility – senior guards Lloyd Potolicchio and "Miggs" Reilly, junior guard Dan Kraus, and junior forward Andy Kostecka, who all came back from World War II military service to play this season. He also brought with him from Notre Dame sophomore guard Tommy O'Keefe and sophomore forward Ray Corley, both of whom transferred to Georgetown to continue to play for him. Given the success of the 1942–43 Georgetown and 1945–46 Notre Dame teams – the former had gone 22–5 and the latter 17–4 – the outlook for 1946–47 was promising.

Kostecka was the team's top scorer all season, as well as in almost two-thirds of the individual games during the year; he set a school record by scoring 35 points against Niagara on January 25, 1947, and he scored 28 against Catholic, 22 against Nevada, and 20 against Penn State. When Duquesne came to Washington on March 4, 1947, to play Georgetown with a 19-game winning streak – one of which had been a victory over the Hoyas four days earlier – Kostecka scored 16 points in a 57-39 Georgetown victory that ended the Dukes' streak. Kostecka broke his arm in a game at Villanova two days later, ending his season, but he finished with 17.8 points per game, the highest average for a Georgetown player in 29 years. Meanwhile, Dan Kraus, although a defensive specialist, finished the year scoring 12 points a game.

Beginning the season with a 5-1 start, the Hoyas lost three of their next five games to fall to 7–4. They went 12–3 after that, finishing the season by winning eight of their last nine, to post a final record of 19–7. They barely missed invitations to the NCAA Tournament and National Invitation Tournament and had no postseason play.

Despite falling just short of a post-season tournament appearance, the 1946–47 team was one of the best in Georgetown history. No other Georgetown team would win 19 games in a season again until the 1975–76 team won 21, and no Georgetown team would exceed its 9–2 road record until the 1983-84 national championship team posted an 11–1 road record during its regular season.

== Roster ==
From the 1943–44 season through this season, the National Collegiate Athletic Association (NCAA) suspended its freshman ineligibility rule. Georgetown had no basketball program during the 1943–44 and 1944–45 seasons, having suspended all competitive athletic programs in 1943 for the duration of World War II, so this was the last Georgetown team to play during this early period of freshman eligibility. After the conclusion of this season, the NCAA reinstated the rule that freshmen were ineligible to play on varsity teams, and they would remain ineligible until the 1972–73 season.

Sophomore guard Tommy O'Keefe would later serve as Georgetown's assistant coach for four seasons from 1956 to 1960 and as head coach for six seasons from 1960 to 1966.

Senior guard Lloyd Potolicchio, who had served in the United States Army Air Forces during World War II, resumed his military career after graduation, serving in the United States Air Force and seeing duty during the Korean War. He was killed on January 17, 1966, when the Boeing KC-135 Stratotanker he was aboard collided with a Boeing B-52 Stratofortress it was refueling over the Mediterranean Sea off Palomares, Spain, and crashed. The B-52, carrying four hydrogen bombs, also crashed, resulting in the Palomares Incident.

#	Name	Height	Weight (lbs.)	Position	Class	Hometown	Previous Team(s)
4	Andy Kostecka	6'3"	200	F	Jr.	Bloomfield, NJ, U.S.	Saint Benedict's Preparatory School
5	Lloyd Potolicchio	5'10"	N/A	G	Sr.	Staten Island, NY, U.S.	Curtis HS
8	Dan Kraus	6'0"	175	G	Jr.	New York, NY, U.S.	DeWitt Clinton HS
11	Jim "Miggs" Reilly	5'6"	N/A	G	Sr.	New York, NY, U.S.	St. Peter's Boys HS
13	Dick Falvey	6'0"	N/A	G	Fr.	New York, NY, U.S.	La Salle Academy
15	Ken "Bud" Brown	6'4"	N/A	C	Jr.	Muncie, IN, U.S.	Burris Laboratory School
16	Tommy O'Keefe	6'0"	180	G	So.	Jersey City, NJ, U.S.	University of Notre Dame
17	Ray Corley	6'2"	180	F	So.	New York, NY, U.S.	La Salle HS
21	George Benigni	6'3"	N/A	G	Jr.	Chicago, IL, U.S.	Notre Dame University
24	Eddie Brembs	6'4"	N/A	F	Jr.	New York, NY, U.S.	N/A
N/A	Joe Connors	6'0"	N/A	G	Jr.	New York, NY, U.S.	Regis High School
N/A	Tom Graham	N/A	N/A	N/A	So.	Philadelphia, PA, U.S.	N/A

== 1946–47 schedule and results ==
The March 13, 1947, game against Boston College was a post-season fundraiser which counted in the term's official final record.

Date time, TV	Opponent	Result	Record	Site city, state
Regular Season
Thu., Dec. 5, 1946 no, no	Idaho	W 59–52	1-0	Uline Arena; Washington, DC
Sat., Dec. 7, 1946 no, no	Penn State	L 37–40	1-1	Brookland Gymnasium; Washington, DC
Tue., Dec. 10, 1946 no, no	at Boston College	W 70–56	2-1	Boston Garden; Boston, MA
Thu., Dec. 12, 1946 no, no	Nevada	W 55–46	3-1	Uline Arena; Washington, DC
Tue., Dec. 17, 1946 no, no	at Richmond	W 46–38	4-1	Richmond Arena; Richmond, VA
Fri., Dec. 20, 1946 no, no	Davis & Elkins	W 70–31	5-1	Uline Arena; Washington, DC
Thu., Jan. 2, 1947 no, no	North Carolina State	L 41–52	5-2	Uline Arena; Washington, DC
Wed., Jan. 8, 1947 no, no	Merchant Marine	W 53–38	6-2	Brookland Gymnasium; Washington, DC
Fri., Jan. 10, 1947 no, no	Villanova	W 68–50	7-2	Brookland Gymnasium; Washington, DC
Mon., Jan. 13, 1947 no, no	at George Washington	L 37–45	7-3	Riverside Stadium; Washington, DC
Wed., Jan. 15, 1947 no, no	Saint Louis	L 42–52	7-4	Uline Arena; Washington, DC
Thu., Jan. 23, 1947 no, no	Western Kentucky	W 57–46	8-4	Uline Arena; Washington, DC
Sat., Jan. 25, 1947 no, no	at Niagara	W 66–64 ^{OT}	9-4	Buffalo Memorial Auditorium; Buffalo, NY
Mon., Jan. 27, 1947 no, no	at Scranton	W 61–31	10-4	Watres Armory; Scranton, PA
Thu., Jan. 30, 1947 no, no	Fordham	L 42–58	10-5	Uline Arena; Washington, DC
Sat., Feb. 1, 1947 no, no	at Catholic	W 65–28	11-5	Brookland Gymnasium; Washington, DC
Tue., Feb. 4, 1947 no, no	at Maryland	L 49–55	11-6	Ritchie Coliseum; College Park, MD
Fri., Feb. 14, 1947 no, no	at La Salle	W 65–59	12-6	Philadelphia Convention Hall; Philadelphia, PA
Mon., Feb. 17, 1947 no, no	George Washington	W 51–44	13-6	Uline Arena; Washington, DC
Wed., Feb. 19, 1947 no, no	Scranton	W 68–36	14-6	Uline Arena; Washington, DC
Fri., Feb. 21, 1947 no, no	at Merchant Marine	W 52–36	15-6	Kings Point Gymnasium; Kings Point, NY
Fri., Feb. 28, 1947 no, no	at Duquesne	L 38–47	15-7	Duquesne Gardens; Pittsburgh, PA
Sat., Mar. 1, 1947 no, no	at Penn State	W 50–42	16-7	Recreation Hall; State College, PA
Tue., Mar. 4, 1947 no, no	Duquesne	W 57–39	17-7	Brookland Gymnasium; Washington, DC
Thu., Mar. 6, 1947 no, no	at Villanova	W 63–55	18-7	Villanova Field House; Villanova, PA
Thu., Mar. 13, 1947 no, no	vs. Boston College	W 61–54	19-7	69th Regiment Armory; New York, NY
*Non-conference game. (#) Tournament seedings in parentheses.
