= 1924–25 Georgetown Hoyas men's basketball team =

American college basketball season

1924–25 Georgetown Hoyas men's basketball
- Conference: Independent
- Record: 6–2
- Head coach: John O'Reilly (9th season)
- Captain: Al Brogan
- Home arena: Ryan Gymnasium

The 1924–25 Georgetown Hoyas men's basketball team represented Georgetown University during the 1924–25 NCAA college basketball season. John O'Reilly coached it in his ninth season as head coach. Georgetown was an independent and played its home games at Ryan Gymnasium on the Georgetown campus in Washington, D.C. The team finished with a record of 6–2.

== Season recap ==
During the mid-1920s, the Georgetown men's basketball program was struggling to survive. Faculty members opposed players missing classes for road games. Furthermore, on-campus Ryan Gymnasium, where the Hoyas had played their home games since the 1914–15 season, had no seating, accommodating fans on a standing-room only-basis on an indoor track above the court. This precluded the accommodation of significant crowds, providing the self-sustaining Basketball Association with little revenue with which to fund the team's travel expenses and limiting Georgetown to a very limited road schedule between the 1918–19 and 1926–27 seasons – often only to an annual trip to Annapolis, Maryland, to play at Navy and sometimes a single trip to New York or Pennsylvania to play schools there – averaging no more than three road games a year in order to keep travel expenses and missed classes to a minimum. The 1924–25 squad played only eight games, finishing 6–2, and played a single road game, against Navy at Annapolis.

Freshman forward Bob Nork played only a single game as a reserve and went scoreless. However, he would emerge the following season as a team leader and top scorer, and would be the best Georgetown player of the mid-1920s.

== Roster ==
Georgetown players did not wear numbers on their jerseys this season. The first numbered jerseys in Georgetown men's basketball history would not appear until the 1933–34 season.

Freshman ineligibility had come and gone at various times among various teams and conferences since 1903. At Georgetown, this was the last year freshmen played on the varsity team until the 1945–46 season.

Junior forward Frank "Hap" Farley went on to become a powerful New Jersey politician, serving in the New Jersey Assembly from 1937 to 1940 and as a state senator from 1940 to 1971. He replaced Enoch "Nucky" Johnson as the de facto "boss" of the Republican Party political machine that ran Atlantic City and Atlantic County, New Jersey, from the early 1940s to the early 1970s.

Name	Height	Weight (lbs.)	Position	Class	Hometown	Previous Team(s)
Al Brogan	N/A	N/A	G	Sr.	Newark, NJ, U.S.	N/A
Frank "Hap" Farley	N/A	N/A	F	Jr.	Atlantic City, New Jersey, U.S.	Wenonah Military Academy
William Finley	N/A	N/A	C	Fr.	Asbury Park, NJ, U.S.	N/A
Don Flavin	N/A	N/A	F	So.	Portland, ME, U.S.	Portland HS
William "Pete" Gitlitz	N/A	N/A	G	Jr.	N/A	N/A
[unknown first name] Gunn	N/A	N/A	N/A	N/A	N/A	N/A
Joe McNaney	N/A	N/A	F	So.	N/A	N/A
Bob Nork	5'6"	N/A	F	Fr.	Shenandoah, PA, U.S.	Shenandoah HS
Richie Ryan	N/A	N/A	F	Jr.	Boston, MA, U.S.	Boston College HS
Jim Sweeney	N/A	N/A	G	Sr.	Boston, MA, U.S.	N/A
George Vukmanic	N/A	N/A	G	Fr.	N/A	N/A

== 1924–25 schedule and results ==
Date time, TV	Opponent	Result	Record	Site city, state
Regular Season
Fri., Jan. 16, 1925 no, no	Wake Forest	W 32–24	1-0	Ryan Gymnasium; Washington, DC
Sat., Jan. 17, 1925 no, no	Western Maryland	W 25–17	2-0	Ryan Gymnasium; Washington, DC
Sat., Jan. 24, 1925 no, no	St. Francis (Pa.)	W 36–24	3-0	Ryan Gymnasium; Washington, DC
Sun., Jan. 25, 1925 no, no	St. Joseph's	W 22–16	4-0	Ryan Gymnasium; Washington, DC
Wed., Feb. 11, 1925 no, no	Carson–Newman	W 35–21	5-0	Ryan Gymnasium; Washington, DC
Fri., Feb. 13, 1925 no, no	Fordham	L 15–22	5-1	Ryan Gymnasium; Washington, DC
Fri., Feb. 20, 1925 no, no	Bucknell	W 27–17	6-1	Ryan Gymnasium; Washington, DC
Sat., Feb. 21, 1925 no, no	at Navy	L 18–33	6-2	Dahlgren Hall; Annapolis, MD
*Non-conference game. (#) Tournament seedings in parentheses.
