= 1949–50 Georgetown Hoyas men's basketball team =

American college basketball season

1949–50 Georgetown Hoyas men's basketball
- Conference: Independent
- Record: 12–12
- Head coach: Francis "Buddy" O'Grady (1st season)
- Assistant coach: Jim "Miggs" Reilly (1st season)
- Captain: Dick Falvey
- Home arena: D.C. Armory

The 1949–50 Georgetown Hoyas men's basketball team represented Georgetown University during the 1949–50 NCAA college basketball season. Francis "Buddy" O'Grady coached it in his first of three seasons as head coach. The team was an independent and played its home games at the D.C. Armory in Washington, D.C. It finished with a record of 12–12 and had no post-season play.

== Season recap ==
New head coach O'Grady had been a three-year standout guard on the Hoya teams of 1939–1942. After military service in World War II, he had played professional basketball for three seasons with the Washington Capitols and the Rochester Royals before retiring to coach at Georgetown.

Although coaches of the freshman team had assisted the varsity team's head coach from time to time, Georgetown had never had a formal assistant coach on the varsity team until this season, when former Georgetown player Jim "Miggs" Reilly became the Hoyas' first formal assistant coach.

The season saw the beginning of annual meetings between rivals Fordham and Georgetown, which would continue through 1979.

Guard Tommy O'Keefe played an unprecedented fourth season on the varsity team this year. Freshmen were ineligible for varsity play under National Collegiate Athletic Association (NCAA) rules at the time, but this had been lifted for four seasons during and just after World War II. The NCAA restored freshman ineligibility in 1947, but when the Georgetown athletic department petitioned the NCAA to recognize O'Keefe's 1946-47 sophomore season at Georgetown as the equivalent of a freshman season prior to the NCAA restoration of freshman ineligibility, the NCAA agreed, allowing O'Keefe to play for Georgetown for a fourth season in 1949–50. He led the 1949–50 team, scoring in double figures in 21 of its 24 games. Early in the year, he shot 10-for-15 from the field in Georgetown's upset of Penn State, and he had a career-high 23 points in an upset of Rutgers. He finished as the team's leading scorer for the third straight year – the first Georgetown player to lead for three straight seasons in 15 years – and was selected to play on the East team alongside Holy Cross standout Bob Cousy in the East-West All-Star Game.

Georgetown's January 14, 1950, game against Holy Cross at Worcester Memorial Auditorium in Worcester, Massachusetts, was the Hoyas' first against a team ranked No. 1 in the Associated Press Poll. Cousey led the Crusaders to a 77–51 victory over Georgetown.

The young, undersized 1949–50 team started with a 10–5 record in its first 15 games, but then struggled, losing seven of its last nine games to finish the year at 12–12. It had no postseason play and was not ranked in the Top 20 in the Associated Press Poll at any time.

O'Keefe ended his Georgetown career with 1,018 points, the first Georgetown player in history to score more than 1,000 points. He would go on to play professional basketball for one season with the Washington Capitols and Baltimore Bullets in 1950–51 and to serve as Georgetown's assistant coach for four seasons from 1956 to 1960 and as head coach for six seasons from 1960 to 1966.

== Roster ==
#	Name	Height	Weight (lbs.)	Position	Class	Hometown	Previous Team(s)
15	Mike Vitale	N/A	N/A	G	So.	East Orange, NJ, U.S.	Seton Hall Preparatory School
16	Tony Durmowicz	6'5"	N/A	F	So.	Baltimore, MD, U.S.	Loyola HS
17	Don O'Leary	6'2"	N/A	G	Jr.	New York, NY, U.S.	La Salle HS
25	Jay Kirby	6'3"	N/A	F	So.	Ridgewood, NJ, U.S.	N/A
26	Clint Conlin	5'11"	N/A	G	Sr.	Washington, DC, U.S.	N/A
27	Tommy O'Keefe	6'0"	180	G	5th year	Jersey City, NJ, U.S.	University of Notre Dame
28	John Mazziotta	6'5"	N/A	F	Jr.	New York, NY, U.S.	N/A
29	Steve Rogers	N/A	N/A	G	Sr.	N/A	N/A
30	Johnny Brown	6'3"	N/A	C	Sr.	Staten Island, NY, U.S.	Tottenville HS
31	Dick Falvey	6'0"	N/A	G	Sr.	New York, NY, U.S.	La Salle Academy
32	Danny Supkis	6'7"	N/A	F	Jr.	New York, NY, U.S.	St. Alban's HS
33	John Norris	6'5"	N/A	C	So.	Bangor, ME, U.S.	Bangor HS
34	Italo Ablondi	6'0"	N/A	G	Sr.	New York, NY, U.S.	Stuyvesant HS
35	Frank Alagia	6'1"	N/A	F	Sr.	New York, NY, U.S.	Andrew Jackson HS

== 1949–50 schedule and results ==
It was common practice at this time for colleges and universities to include non-collegiate opponents in their schedules, with the games recognized as part of their official record for the season, and the December 9, 1949, game against the New York Athletic Club therefore counted as part of Georgetown's won-loss record for 1949-50. It was not until 1952 after the completion of the 1951-52 season that the National Collegiate Athletic Association (NCAA) ruled that colleges and universities could no longer count games played against non-collegiate opponents in their annual won-loss records.

Date time, TV	Rank^{#}	Opponent^{#}	Result	Record	Site city, state
Regular Season
Mon., Dec. 5, 1949 no, no		at Catholic	W 73–46	1-0	Brookland Gymnasium; Washington, DC
Wed., Dec. 7, 1949 no, no		at American	W 68–63	2-0	Uline Arena; Washington, DC
Fri., Dec. 9, 1949 no, no		at New York Athletic Club	W 78–70	3-0	New York Athletic Club Gymnasium; New York, NY
Wed., Dec. 14, 1949 no, no		Penn State	W 70–63	4-0	D.C. Armory; Washington, DC
Sat., Dec. 17, 1949 no, no		Harvard	W 58–53	5-0	D.C. Armory; Washington, DC
Sat., Dec. 31, 1949 no, no		at La Salle	L 58–90	5-1	Philadelphia Convention Hall; Philadelphia, PA
Sat., Jan. 7, 1950 no, no		Maryland	L 65–71	5-2	D.C. Armory; Washington, DC
Fri., Jan. 13, 1950 no, no		at St. John's	L 66–67	5-3	69th Regiment Armory; New York, NY
Sat., Jan. 14, 1950 no, no		at No. 1 Holy Cross	L 51–77	5-4	Worcester Memorial Auditorium; Worcester, MA
Tue., Jan. 17, 1950 no, no		at Siena	W 47–42	6-4	Washington Avenue Armory; Albany, NY
Sun., Jan. 22, 1950 no, no		at Canisius	L 41–58	6-5	Buffalo Memorial Auditorium; Buffalo, NY
Sat., Jan. 28, 1950 no, no		George Washington	W 68–66	7-5	D.C. Armory; Washington, DC
Wed., Feb. 1, 1950 no, no		vs. Lafayette	W 59–50	8-5	Clendenen Gymnasium; Washington, DC
Sat., Feb. 4, 1950 no, no		at New York University	W 71–60	9-5	D.C. Armory; Washington, DC
Wed., Feb. 8, 1950 no, no		at Rutgers	W 75–73	10-5	College Avenue Gymnasium; New Brunswick, NJ
Thu., Feb. 9, 1950 no, no		at Fordham	L 63–64	10-6	Rose Hill Gymnasium; Bronx, NY
Sat., Feb. 11, 1950 no, no		Villanova	L 45–73	10-7	D.C. Armory; Washington, DC
Wed., Feb. 15, 1950 no, no		at George Washington	L 66–68	10-8	Uline Arena; Washington, DC
Sat., Feb. 18, 1950 no, no		at Gettysburg	W 71–65	11-8	N/A; Gettysburg, PA
Wed., Feb. 22, 1950 no, no		at Pennsylvania	W 78–73	12-8	Palestra; Philadelphia, PA
Tue., Feb. 28, 1950 no, no		at Seton Hall	L 65–77	12-9	Walsh Gymnasium; South Orange, NJ
Sat., Mar. 4, 1950 no, no		at Penn State	L 56–65	12-10	Recreation Hall; State College, PA
Mon., Mar. 6, 1950 no, no		at Villanova	L 72–82	12-11	Villanova Field House; Villanova, PA
Tue., Mar. 7, 1950 no, no		at Princeton	L 49–63	12-12	Dillon Gymnasium; Princeton, NJ
*Non-conference game. ^{#}Rankings from AP Poll. (#) Tournament seedings in parentheses.
