= 1925–26 Georgetown Hoyas men's basketball team =

American college basketball season

1925–26 Georgetown Hoyas men's basketball
- Conference: Independent
- Record: 5–8
- Head coach: John O'Reilly (10th season)
- Captain: William Gitlitz
- Home arena: Ryan Gymnasium

The 1925–26 Georgetown Hoyas men's basketball team represented Georgetown University during the 1925–26 NCAA college basketball season. John O'Reilly coached it in his 10th season as head coach. Georgetown was an independent and played its home games at Ryan Gymnasium on the Georgetown campus in Washington, D.C. The team posted a record of 5–8.

== Season recap ==
During the mid-1920s, the Georgetown men's basketball program was struggling to survive. Faculty members opposed players missing classes for road games. Furthermore, on-campus Ryan Gymnasium, where the Hoyas had played their home games since the 1914–15 season, had no seating, accommodating fans on a standing-room only-basis on an indoor track above the court. This precluded the accommodation of significant crowds, providing the self-sustaining Basketball Association with little revenue with which to fund the team's travel expenses and limiting Georgetown to a very limited road schedule between the 1918–19 and 1926–27 seasons – often limited to an annual trip to Annapolis, Maryland, to play at Navy and sometimes a single trip to New York or Pennsylvania to play schools there – averaging no more than three road games a year in order to keep travel expenses and missed classes to a minimum. The 1925–26 squad, however, was among the more traveled Georgetown teams of the era, going on the road to play at Army and Penn State in addition to trips to Annapolis and New York City. It nonetheless played only 13 games, and its 5–8 finish was only the second losing record in school history and the first since the 1909–10 team finished 5–7. It was the only losing season by an O'Reilly-coached team.

Sophomore forward Bob Nork had played only a single game as a reserve the previous year and gone scoreless, but this season he emerged as the team's leading scorer by a wide margin. While the rest of the team struggled in all aspects of the game, he averaged a career-high 10.4 points per game and scored a career-high 135 points, while the other four starters combined scored only 141 points. He scored 12 of the team's 20 points against Lafayette and 11 of its 20 points against Army

== Roster ==
Georgetown players did not wear numbers on their jerseys this season. The first numbered jerseys in Georgetown men's basketball history would not appear until the 1933-34 season.

| Name | Height | Weight (lbs.) | Position | Class | Hometown | Previous Team(s) |
|---|---|---|---|---|---|---|
| George Donovan | N/A | N/A | G | So. | Springfield, MA, U.S. | Dean HS |
| Don Flavin | N/A | N/A | F | Jr. | Portland, ME, U.S. | Portland HS |
| William "Pete" Gitlitz | N/A | N/A | G | Sr. | N/A | N/A |
| Walter Hickey | N/A | N/A | G | Jr. | Rochester, NY, U.S. | Aquinas Institute |
| Al Johannes (or Johannis) | N/A | N/A | C | Sr. | N/A | N/A |
| Don McCann | N/A | N/A | G | So. or Sr. | South Portland, ME, U.S. | Portland HS |
| Bob Nork | 5'6" | N/A | F | So. | Shenandoah, PA, U.S. | Shenandoah HS |
| Tom O'Leary | N/A | N/A | G | N/A | N/A | N/A |
| Richie Ryan | N/A | N/A | F | Sr. | Boston, MA, U.S. | Boston College HS |
| John Shea | N/A | N/A | C | N/A | N/A | N/A |
| John Tomaini | N/A | N/A | C | Jr. | N/A | N/A |
| George Vukmanic | N/A | N/A | G | So. | N/A | N/A |

== 1925–26 schedule and results ==
It was common practice at this time for colleges and universities to include non-collegiate opponents in their schedules, with the games recognized as part of their official record for the season, so the February 24, 1926, game against the Crescent Athletic Club counted as part of Georgetown's won-loss record for 1925-26. It was not until 1952, after the completion of the 1951-52 season, that the National Collegiate Athletic Association (NCAA) ruled that colleges and universities could no longer count games played against non-collegiate opponents in their annual won-loss records.

| Date time, TV | Opponent | Result | Record | Site city, state |
Regular Season
| Mon., Jan. 11, 1926 no, no | Mount St. Mary's | W 32–31 | 1-0 | Ryan Gymnasium; Washington, DC |
| Tue., Jan. 12, 1926 no, no | Lafayette | L 20–21 ^{OT} | 1-1 | Ryan Gymnasium; Washington, DC |
| Sat., Jan. 16, 1926 no, no | Bucknell | L 18–23 | 1-2 | Ryan Gymnasium; Washington, DC |
| Sat., Jan. 23, 1926 no, no | at Army | L 20–47 | 1-3 | Hayes Gymnasium; West Point, NY |
| Tue., Jan. 26, 1926 no, no | Lebanon Valley | W 26–22 | 2-3 | Ryan Gymnasium; Washington, DC |
| Sat., Jan. 30, 1926 no, no | Washington (Md.) | W 27–23 | 3-3 | Ryan Gymnasium; Washington, DC |
| Fri., Feb. 5, 1926 no, no | Navy | L 29–42 | 3-4 | Dahlgren Hall; Annapolis, MD |
| Wed., Feb. 10, 1926 no, no | Dickinson | W 24–15 | 4-4 | Ryan Gymnasium; Washington, DC |
| Fri., Feb. 12, 1926 no, no | at Penn State | L 19-30 | 4-5 | Armory; State College, PA |
| Fri., Feb. 19, 1926 no, no | William & Mary | L 23–25 | 4-6 | Ryan Gymnasium; Washington, DC |
| Wed., Feb. 24, 1926 no, no | at Crescent Athletic Club | L 35–44 | 4-7 | Crescent Gymnasium; New York, NY |
| Thu., Feb. 25, 1926 no, no | at Fordham | L 18–35 | 4-8 | Rose Hill Gymnasium; Bronx, NY |
| Fri., Feb. 26, 1926 no, no | Pennsylvania Military | W 43–34 | 5-8 | Ryan Gymnasium; Washington, DC |
*Non-conference game. (#) Tournament seedings in parentheses.
