= 1945–46 Georgetown Hoyas men's basketball team =

American college basketball season

1945–46 Georgetown Hoyas men's basketball
- Conference: Independent
- Record: 11–9
- Head coach: Ken Engles (1st season)
- Home arena: Brookland Gymnasium

The 1945–46 Georgetown Hoyas men's basketball team represented Georgetown University during the 1945–46 NCAA college basketball season. Ken Engles coached it in his only season as head coach. It played its home games on the campus of The Catholic University of America at Brookland Gymnasium in Washington, D.C., the only Georgetown team to play home games there with the exception of the 1946–47 team, which played four games there the following season.

== Season recap ==
Georgetown had made its only post-season tournament appearance thus far in the 1942–43 season, when it advanced to the final of the 1943 NCAA Tournament. However, the school had suspended all of its athletic programs later in 1943 for the duration of World War II, prompting head coach Elmer Ripley to leave to coach at Columbia and ending the collegiate careers of many of its players, while other Georgetown players who retained eligibility transferred to other schools to continue their collegiate basketball careers or entered military service, planning to return to Georgetown and resume college basketball there after the war.

Georgetown had no basketball program during the 1943–44 and 1944-45 seasons. After World War II ended in August 1945, the school resumed athletic competition and began to put together a varsity men's basketball team for the 1945–46 season. Ripley had left Columbia after coaching there for two years but had committed to coach Notre Dame in 1945–46, and those Georgetown players from the 1942–43 team retaining eligibility to play had either transferred elsewhere or had not yet returned to Georgetown from military service.

As result of all of this, the team Georgetown fielded for the season was unusual. With Ripley unavailable, senior forward Ken Engles – an older player who had played on the 1940–41 and 1941–42 teams before leaving school after the United States entered World War II – had returned this season for his third and final year of eligibility, and he was pressed into service as head coach, becoming the only player-coach in Georgetown men's basketball history. Aside from Engles, none of the players had prior varsity experience, and only one of them – freshman forward Ed Benigni – played on the team the following season when Ripley returned to coach Georgetown.

The virtually all-walk-on 1945–46 team played an abbreviated schedule, finishing with a record of 11–9 and having no postseason play.

== Roster ==
From the 1943–44 season through the 1946-47 season, the National Collegiate Athletic Association (NCAA) suspended its freshman ineligibility rule. Georgetown had no athletic programs during the 1943–44 and 1944-45 seasons, so this was the first Georgetown varsity team to include freshman.

Some players appeared in only one or a handful of games in this unusual season, leading to the large size of the roster.

#	Name	Height	Weight (lbs.)	Position	Class	Hometown	Previous Team(s)
17	Ken Engles	6'2"	N/A	F	Sr.	Staten Island, NY, U.S.	Port Richmond HS
21	George Benigni	6'3"	N/A	F	Fr.	Chicago, IL, U.S.	Notre Dame University
N/A	Frank Aires	5'10"	N/A	G	So.	New York, NY, U.S.	Chaminade HS
N/A	Peter Baker	6'1"	N/A	G	Jr.	Passaic, NJ, U.S.	Passaic HS
N/A	Art Bartolozzi	N/A	N/A	G	So.	N/A	N/A
N/A	Gene Beauchamp	N/A	N/A	N/A	So.	N/A	N/A
N/A	Brooke "Tony" Beyer	N/A	N/A	G	Jr.	Washington, DC, U.S.	Georgetown Preparatory School
N/A	Joe Daly	N/A	N/A	G	Jr.	New York, NY, U.S.	Fordham Preparatory School
N/A	Jim Davis	N/A	N/A	N/A	Jr.	N/A	N/A
N/A	Ed Drysgula	N/A	N/A	F	So.	Hartford, CT, U.S.	St. Thomas High School
N/A	Paul Durkin	N/A	N/A	F	So.	Washington, DC, U.S.	St. John's College HS
N/A	Tom Galla	N/A	N/A	Guard	Fr.	Bridgeport, CT, U.S.	N/A
N/A	Chuck Hagan	N/A	N/A	Guard	Sr.	N/A	N/A
N/A	Dick Henning	N/A	N/A	Guard	So.	N/A	N/A
N/A	John "Red" McGuiness	N/A	N/A	Guard	Sr.	Newark, NJ, U.S.	N/A
N/A	Frank McNamara	6'4"	N/A	Forward	Fr.	Washington, DC, U.S.	Gonzaga College HS
N/A	Justin Moloney	N/A	N/A	Forward	N/A	N/A	N/A
N/A	Phil O'Hara	N/A	N/A	Guard	So.	N/A	N/A
N/A	Ervin Ornstein	N/A	N/A	Guard	So.	Washington, DC, U.S.	N/A
N/A	Chris Pavich	6'4"	N/A	Forward	Jr.	Peoria, IL, U.S.	N/A
N/A	Herb Saturn	N/A	N/A	N/A	N/A	N/A	N/A
N/A	Tony Schaefer	N/A	N/A	N/A	So.	N/A	N/A
N/A	Otto Stewart	N/A	N/A	Guard	So.	N/A	N/A
N/A	Ed Wallace	N/A	N/A	N/A	So.	N/A	N/A
N/A	Tom Wolfe	N/A	N/A	Forward	So.	Nashville, TN, U.S.	N/A

== 1945–46 schedule and results ==
It was common practice at this time for colleges and universities to include non-collegiate opponents in their schedules, with the games recognized as part of their official record for the season, and the games played against United States Army teams from Fort George G. Meade and the United States Army War College and a United States Navy team from Naval Annex Anacostia therefore counted as part of Georgetown's won-loss record for 1945–46. It was not until 1952, after the completion of the 1951–52 season, that the National Collegiate Athletic Association (NCAA) ruled that colleges and universities could no longer count games played against non-collegiate opponents in their annual won-loss records.

Date time, TV	Opponent	Result	Record	Site city, state
Regular Season
Wed., Nov. 28, 1945 no, no	at Villanova	L 37–40	0-1	Villanova Field House; Villanova, PA
Sat., Dec. 1, 1945 no, no	at Loyola Maryland	W 57–46	1-1	Alumni Gymnasium; Baltimore, MD
Wed., Dec. 12, 1945 no, no	at Fort Meade	L 27–39	1-2	Camp Meade Gymnasium; Fort George G. Meade, MD
Sat., Dec. 15, 1945 no, no	Army War College	W 48–25	2-2	Brookland Gymnasium; Washington, DC
Sat., Jan. 5, 1946 no, no	at Scranton	L 46–54	2-3	Watres Armory; Scranton, PA
Mon., Jan. 7, 1946 no, no	George Washington	L 43–45	2-4	Brookland Gymnasium; Washington, DC
Wed., Jan. 9, 1946 no, no	at Naval Annex	W 47–25	3-4	Annex Gymnasium; Naval Annex Anacostia, DC
Sat., Jan. 12, 1946 no, no	Scranton	W 32–29	4-4	Brookland Gymnasium; Washington, DC
Tue., Jan. 15, 1946 no, no	Fort Meade	L 41–51	4-5	Brookland Gymnasium; Washington, DC
Sat., Jan. 19, 1946 no, no	Loyola Maryland	L 41–48	4-6	Brookland Gymnasium; Washington, DC
Tue., Jan. 22, 1946 no, no	Army War College	L 47–50	4-7	Brookland Gymnasium; Washington, DC
Wed., Feb. 6, 1946 no, no	at Catholic	W 36–27	5-7	Brookland Gymnasium; Washington, DC
Fri., Feb. 8, 1946 no, no	at Gallaudet	W 49–32	6-7	Gallaudet Gymnasium; Washington, DC
Tue., Feb. 12, 1946 no, no	at George Washington	L 36–54	6-8	Riverside Stadium; Washington, DC
Sat., Feb. 16, 1946 no, no	La Salle	L 53–55	6-9	Brookland Gymnasium; Washington, DC
Wed., Feb. 20, 1946 no, no	American	W 65–48	7-9	Brookland Gymnasium; Washington, DC
Wed., Feb. 27, 1946 no, no	Naval Annex	W 50–31	8-9	Brookland Gymnasium; Washington, DC
Fri., Mar. 1, 1946 no, no	at American	W 53–52	9-9	Clendenen Gymnasium; Washington, DC
Thu., Mar. 7, 1946 no, no	Catholic	W 49–31	10-9	Brookland Gymnasium; Washington, DC
Sat., Mar. 9, 1946 no, no	at La Salle	W 54–37	11-9	Philadelphia Convention Hall; Philadelphia, PA
*Non-conference game. (#) Tournament seedings in parentheses.
