= 1951–52 Georgetown Hoyas men's basketball team =

American college basketball season

1951–52 Georgetown Hoyas men's basketball
- Conference: Independent
- Record: 15–10
- Head coach: Francis "Buddy" O'Grady (3rd season)
- Assistant coach: Dominic Cara (2nd season)
- Captain: Mike Vitale
- Home arena: McDonough Gymnasium

The 1951–52 Georgetown Hoyas men's basketball team represented Georgetown University during the 1951–52 NCAA college basketball season. Francis "Buddy" O'Grady coached it in his third and final season as head coach. The team was an independent and played its home games at McDonough Gymnasium on the Georgetown campus in Washington, D.C. It finished the season with a record of 15–10 and had no postseason play.

== Season recap ==
The 1951–52 team was the first to play its home games at McDonough Gymnasium, marking the first time the Georgetown men's basketball team played on campus since the 1926–27 team used Ryan Gymnasium as its home court. It played its first game at McDonough on December 7, 1951 – the day before a ribbon-cutting ceremony officially opened the new gymnasium – against Fordham. Although the Hoyas lost the game, the 1951–52 team went on to post an 11–1 home record during McDonough's inaugural season – the first of 29 winning home records during the 30 seasons Georgetown played its home games there.

Junior center Bill Bolger had a standout year. Playing in all 25 games, he scored in double figures 20 times, including 25 against Dayton and 29 against Wake Forest. His late-season 38 points against Mount St. Mary's on February 27, 1952, set a new Georgetown single-game scoring record. He scored 435 points during the year – also a school record – and his 17.4 points per game was the highest average by a Georgetown player in 34 years.

Junior guard Barry Sullivan was the team's point guard and other big scoring threat, and he and Bolger averaged a combined 32 points per game. Playing in 22 games, Sullivan himself led the team in scoring in ten of them, with a 26-point game against Princeton and 25 each against Pittsburgh and George Washington. He recovered from late-season injuries to average 21 points per game in the last two games of the season, and he made the winning basket in Georgetown's 72–70 defeat of George Washington in the final game of the year. Sullivan left school at the end of the year for two years of United States Army service in Korea during the Korean War and did not return to Georgetown, instead later completing his undergraduate studies at Columbia.

Junior center Hugh Beins averaged 8.7 points per game for the second straight season, appearing in all 25 games and scoring in double figures 10 times. His most notable performances were a 15-point game against Catholic in which Georgetown broke a three-game losing streak and 12 points in Georgetown's only victory over La Salle between 1948 and 1955.

Sophomore guard Lou Gigante backed up Sullivan this season, but showed his potential for the future, coming off the bench to average 6.2 points per game, highlighted by 21 points against Richmond and 18 against Maryland in back-to-back performances in February 1952. He also demonstrated defensive prowess. He would become the team's starting point guard after Sullivan's departure.

O'Grady's previous two Georgetown teams had struggled, but the 1951–52 team finished with a record of 15–10, his most successful team and the highest win total for a Hoya team between the 1946–47 and 1963–64 seasons. Although it was not invited to a post-season tournament, its performance and the team's move to an on-campus venue for its home games combined to create a sense of optimism in and around the program about its prospects for the future. Despite this, O'Grady resigned at the end of the season, departing with an overall record of 35–36, one winning season, and no post-season tournament appearances during his three-year tenure.

The 1951–52 team was not ranked in the Top 20 in the Associated Press Poll or Top 30 in the Coaches' Poll at any time.

== Roster ==
#	Name	Height	Weight (lbs.)	Position	Class	Hometown	Previous Team(s)
6	Tommy Doyle	6'0"	N/A	F	So.	New York, NY, U.S.	St. Francis Preparatory School
8	Gerry Nappy	6'6"	N/A	G	Jr.	Teaneck, NJ, U.S.	Xavier HS (New York, NY)
11	Bob Makatura	5'10"	N/A	G	Jr.	New York, NY, U.S.	St. Francis Preparatory School
12	Tony Durmowicz	6'5"	N/A	F	Sr.	Baltimore, MD, U.S.	Loyola HS
13	Lou Gigante	5'9"	N/A	G	So.	New York, NY, U.S.	Cardinal Hayes HS
15	Mike Vitale	N/A	N/A	G	Sr.	East Orange, NJ, U.S.	Seton Hall Preparatory School
20	Bob Stuhr	6'1"	N/A	G	Jr.	Garden City, NY, U.S.	Garden City HS
21 (home); 27 (road)	Hugh Beins	6'7"	N/A	C	Jr.	New York, NY, U.S.	Manhattan Preparatory School
24	Billy Wolfer	6'5"	N/A	F	Jr.	Allentown, PA, U.S.	Allentown Central Catholic HS
26	Dennis Murphy	6'5"	N/A	G	Jr.	New York, NY, U.S.	Cardinal Hayes HS
30	Bill Bolger	6'5"	205	F	Jr.	New York, NY, U.S.	Xavier HS
40	Barry Sullivan	6'1"	N/A	G	Jr.	New York, NY, U.S.	Regis HS
N/A	Jack Hekker	6'4"	N/A	G	Jr.	North Arlington, NJ, U.S.	Queen of Peace HS
N/A	Lee Smith	6'0"	N/A	G	So.	Easton, PA, U.S.	Easton Area HS
N/A	Bill Stors	6'5"	N/A	G	Jr.	New York, NY, U.S.	Regis HS

== 1951–52 schedule and results ==
It had been a common practice for many years for colleges and universities to include non-collegiate opponents in their schedules, with the games recognized as part of their official record for the season, and the March 2, 1952, game against the New York Athletic Club therefore counted as part of Georgetown's won-loss record for 1951–52. Later in 1952, however, after the end of the season, the National Collegiate Athletic Association (NCAA) ruled that colleges and universities could no longer count games played against non-collegiate opponents in their annual won-loss records. Although Georgetown scheduled games against the New York Athletic Club during the regular season up until the 1961–62 season, those after the 1951–52 season were only exhibition games. The March 2, 1952, game thus became the last one against a non-collegiate opponent to count as part of Georgetown's regular season.

Date time, TV	Rank^{#}	Opponent^{#}	Result	Record	Site city, state
Regular Season
Fri., Dec. 7, 1951 no, no		Fordham	L 50–57	0-1	McDonough Gymnasium; Washington, DC
Wed., Dec. 12, 1951 no, no		Loyola Maryland	W 70–59	1-1	McDonough Gymnasium; Washington, DC
Sat., Dec. 15, 1951 no, no		Randolph–Macon	W 78–39	2-1	McDonough Gymnasium; Washington, DC
Mon., Dec. 17, 1951 no, no		Catholic	W 88–44	3-1	McDonough Gymnasium; Washington, DC
Thu., Dec. 20, 1951 no, no		Princeton	W 84–62	4-1	McDonough Gymnasium; Washington, DC
Sat., Jan. 5, 1952 no, no		Wake Forest	W 80–61	5-1	McDonough Gymnasium; Washington, DC
Fri., Jan. 11, 1952 no, no		at Maryland	L 40–55	5-2	Ritchie Coliseum; College Park, MD
Sun., Jan. 13, 1952 no, no		at Navy	L 62–82	5-3	Dahlgren Hall; Annapolis, MD
Fri., Jan. 18, 1952 no, no		at George Washington	L 75–81 ^{OT}	5-4	Uline Arena; Washington, DC
Tue., Jan. 22, 1952 no, no		at Detroit	L 74–80	5-5	N/A; Detroit, MI
Wed., Jan. 23, 1952 no, no		at Dayton	L 74–80	5-6	N/A; Dayton, OH
Fri., Jan. 25, 1952 no, no		at Pittsburgh	W 74–59	6-6	Pitt Pavilion; Pittsburgh, PA
Tue., Jan. 29, 1952 no, no		Scranton	W 70–56	7-6	McDonough Gymnasium; Washington, DC
Fri., Feb. 1, 1952 no, no		Canisius	W 75–67	8-6	McDonough Gymnasium; Washington, DC
Sun., Feb. 3, 1952 no, no		at Fordham	L 58–70	8-7	Rose Hill Gymnasium; Bronx, NY
Thu., Feb. 7, 1952 no, no		at St. Francis	L 79–85	8-8	Doyle Hall; Loretto, PA
Sat., Feb. 9, 1952 no, no		at Penn State	L 55–83	8-9	Recreation Hall; State College, PA
Tue., Feb. 12, 1952 no, no		at Catholic	W 96–52	9-9	Brookland Gymnasium; Washington, DC
Sat., Feb. 16, 1952 no, no		Richmond	W 69–54	10-9	McDonough Gymnasium; Washington, DC
Thu., Feb. 21, 1952 no, no		Maryland	W 71–61	11-9	McDonough Gymnasium; Washington, DC
Fri., Feb. 22, 1952 no, no		at La Salle	W 70–68	12-9	Philadelphia Convention Hall; Philadelphia, PA
Wed., Feb. 27, 1952 no, no		Mount St. Mary's	W 85–55	13-9	McDonough Gymnasium; Washington, DC
Sat., Mar. 1, 1952 no, no		at Seton Hall	L 71–100	13-10	Walsh Gymnasium; South Orange, NJ
Sun., Mar. 2, 1952 no, no		at New York Athletic Club	W 69–64	14-10	New York Athletic Club Gymnasium; New York, NY
Tue., Mar. 4, 1952 no, no		George Washington	W 72–70	15-10	McDonough Gymnasium; Washington, DC
*Non-conference game. ^{#}Rankings from AP Poll. (#) Tournament seedings in parentheses.
