= Andy Kostecka =

American basketball player (1921–2007)

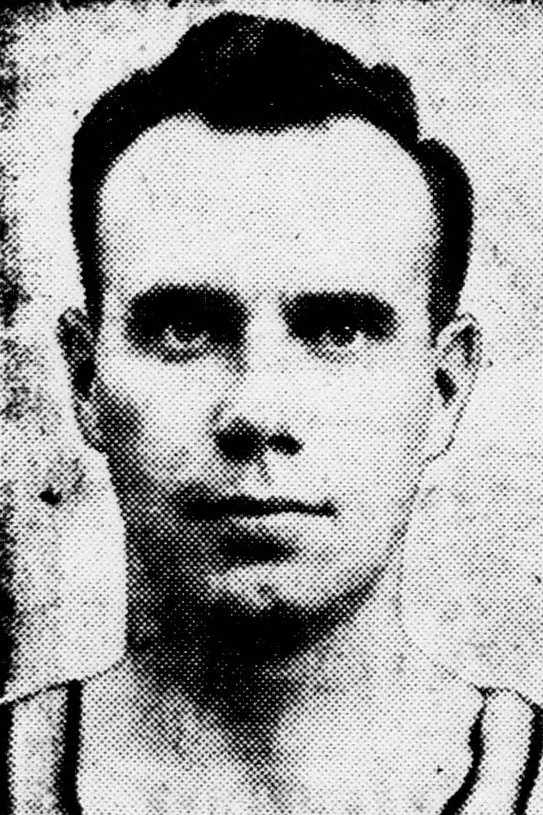
- Kostecka, circa 1947

Personal information
- Born: February 10, 1921 Newark, New Jersey, U.S.
- Died: January 17, 2007 (aged 85) Bethesda, Maryland, U.S.
- Listed height: 6 ft 3 in (1.91 m)
- Listed weight: 203 lb (92 kg)

Career information
- High school: Bloomfield (Bloomfield, New Jersey)
- College: Georgetown (1941–1943, 1946–1948)
- BAA draft: 1948: – round, –
- Drafted by: Indianapolis Jets
- Playing career: 1948–1949
- Position: Forward
- Number: 70

Career history
- 1948–1949: Indianapolis Jets

Career BAA statistics
- Points: 135 (6.4 ppg)
- Assists: 14 (0.7 apg)
- Stats at NBA.com
- Stats at Basketball Reference

Andrew Edward Kostecka (February 10, 1921 – January 17, 2007) was an American professional basketball player. Kostecka was selected in the 1948 BAA draft by the Indianapolis Jets after a collegiate career at Georgetown. He played for the Jets for one season before retiring from basketball.

In his post-basketball career, Kostecka worked for the Central Intelligence Agency (CIA) and Department of Commerce. Kostecka was also in the United States Army, and during World War II he "served as General Douglas MacArthur's Russian interpreter and was among the first group of Americans to enter Nagasaki after the explosion of the atomic bomb over the city." He became a 1st Lieutenant.

He is buried in Arlington National Cemetery. His grandson Andrew Kostecka III played for Loyola (Maryland) and currently in Israel.

== BAA career statistics ==
Legend
GP	Games played
FG%	Field-goal percentage
FT%	Free-throw percentage
APG	Assists per game
PPG	Points per game

=== Regular season ===
Year	Team	GP	FG%	FT%	APG	PPG
1948–49	Indianapolis	21	.418	.614	.7	6.4
Career		21	.418	.614	.7	6.4
