= Buddy O'Grady =

American basketball player, coach (1920–1992)

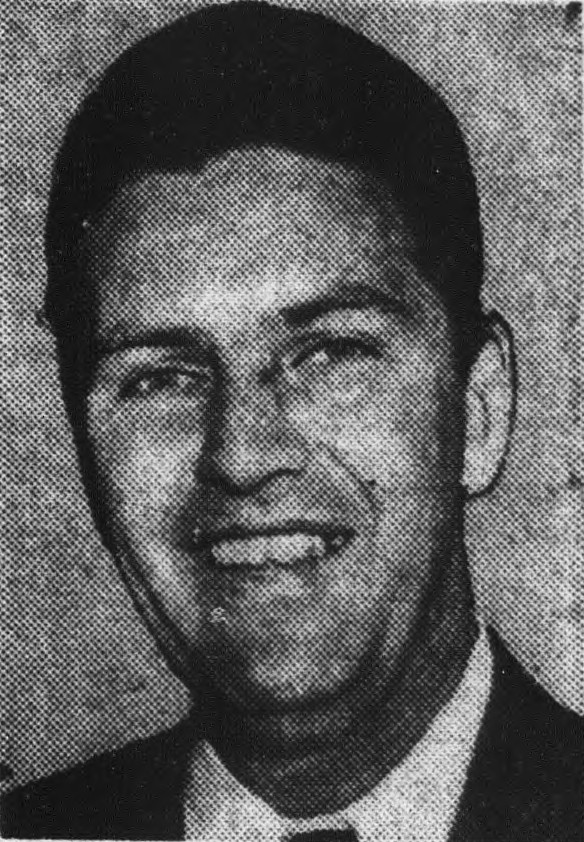
- O'Grady, circa 1952

Personal information
- Born: January 19, 1920 New York City, New York, U.S.
- Died: February 19, 1992 (aged 72)
- Listed height: 5 ft 11 in (1.80 m)
- Listed weight: 160 lb (73 kg)

Career information
- High school: St. Peter's Boys; (Staten Island, New York)
- College: Georgetown (1939–1942)
- Playing career: 1946–1949
- Position: Guard
- Number: 6, 21, 9
- Coaching career: 1949–1952

Career history

Playing
- 1946–1947: Washington Capitols
- 1947–1949: St. Louis Bombers
- 1949: Providence Steamrollers

Coaching
- 1949–1952: Georgetown
- Stats at NBA.com
- Stats at Basketball Reference

Francis David "Buddy" O'Grady (January 19, 1920 – February 19, 1992) was an American professional basketball player and coach.

A 5'11" guard from Georgetown University, O'Grady played professionally in the Basketball Association of America (BAA) from 1946 to 1949. He competed for the Washington Capitols, St. Louis Bombers, and Providence Steamrollers and averaged 3.7 points per game.

For three seasons from 1949 to 1952, O'Grady served as head coach of the Georgetown Hoyas, with an overall record of 35-36 and no post-season tournament appearances. He was elected to Georgetown's Athletic Hall of Fame in 1958.

== BAA career statistics ==
Legend
GP	Games played	FG%	Field-goal percentage
FT%	Free-throw percentage	APG	Assists per game
PPG	Points per game	**Bold**	Career high

=== Regular season ===
Year	Team	GP	FG%	FT%	APG	PPG
1946–47	Washington	**55**	.238	.717	.4	2.7
1947–48	St. Louis	44	.261	.667	.2	3.9
1948–49	St. Louis	30	**.295**	**.739**	1.4	4.6
1948–49	Providence	17	.282	.600	**1.5**	**4.8**
Career		146	.265	.691	.7	3.7

=== Playoffs ===
Year	Team	GP	FG%	FT%	APG	PPG
1947	Washington	6	.100	**1.000**	.0	1.5
1948	St. Louis	**7**	**.333**	**1.000**	.0	**3.6**
Career		13	.245	1.000	.0	2.6

== Head coaching record ==
Record table
Season	Team	Overall	Conference	Standing	Postseason
**Georgetown Hoyas** (Independent) (1949–1952)
1949–50	Georgetown	12–12			
1950–51	Georgetown	8–14			
1951–52	Georgetown	15–10			
Georgetown:		35–36			
Total:		35–36			
