= Dan Kraus =

American basketball player

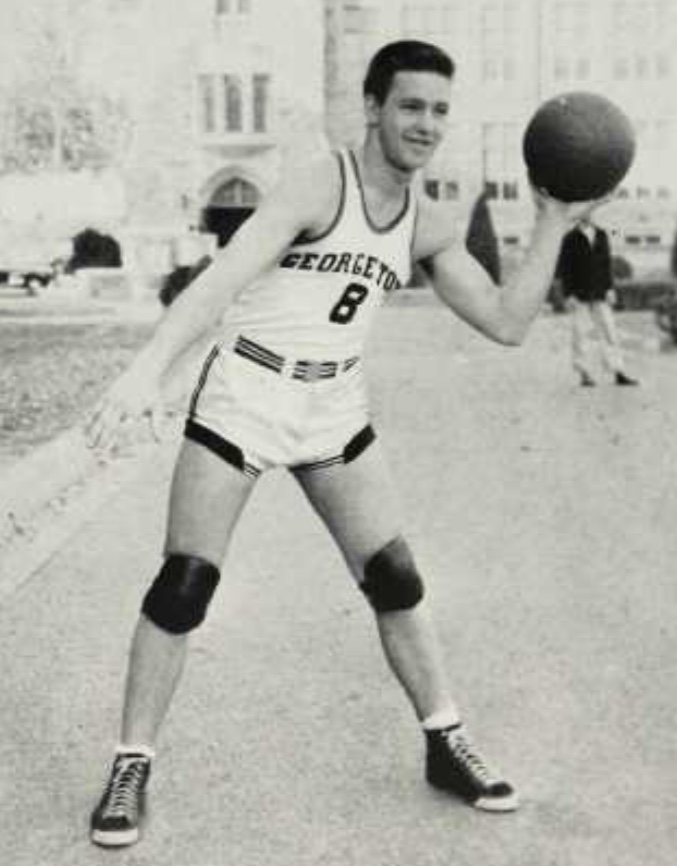
- Kraus in 1943

Personal information
- Born: February 13, 1922 New York City, New York, U.S.
- Died: December 28, 2012 (aged 90) Columbia, Maryland, U.S.
- Listed height: 6 ft 0 in (1.83 m)
- Listed weight: 195 lb (88 kg)

Career information
- High school: DeWitt Clinton (Bronx, New York)
- College: Georgetown (1942–1943, 1946–1948)
- BAA draft: 1948: – round, –
- Drafted by: Baltimore Bullets
- Playing career: 1948–1949
- Position: Point guard
- Number: 15

Career history
- 1948–1949: Baltimore Bullets

Career highlights
- Second-team All-American – Helms (1947)

Career BAA statistics
- Points: 21 (1.6 ppg)
- Assists: 7 (0.5 apg)
- Stats at NBA.com
- Stats at Basketball Reference

Daniel Joseph Kraus (February 13, 1923 – December 28, 2012) was an American professional basketball player. Kraus was selected in the 1948 BAA Draft by the Baltimore Bullets after a collegiate career at Georgetown. He played for the Bullets for one season before retiring from basketball.

Between 1951 and 1977 he served as an FBI special agent.

== BAA career statistics ==
Legend
GP	Games played
FG%	Field-goal percentage
FT%	Free-throw percentage
APG	Assists per game
PPG	Points per game

=== Regular season ===
Year	Team	GP	FG%	FT%	APG	PPG
1948–49	Baltimore	13	.143	.458	.5	1.6
Career		13	.143	.458	.5	1.6
