= Riverside Stadium (Washington, D.C.) =

Multi-purpose sports arena (demolished)

- Interactive map of Riverside Stadium
- Full name: Riverside Stadium
- Location: Washington D.C., United States
- Coordinates: 38.8948°N 77.0555°W
- Operator: L. E. and S. G. Leoffler

Construction
- Opened: 1938
- Renovated: 1964
- Closed: 1952

Riverside Stadium was a multi-purpose sports arena with a roller rink located in Washington D.C.

== History ==
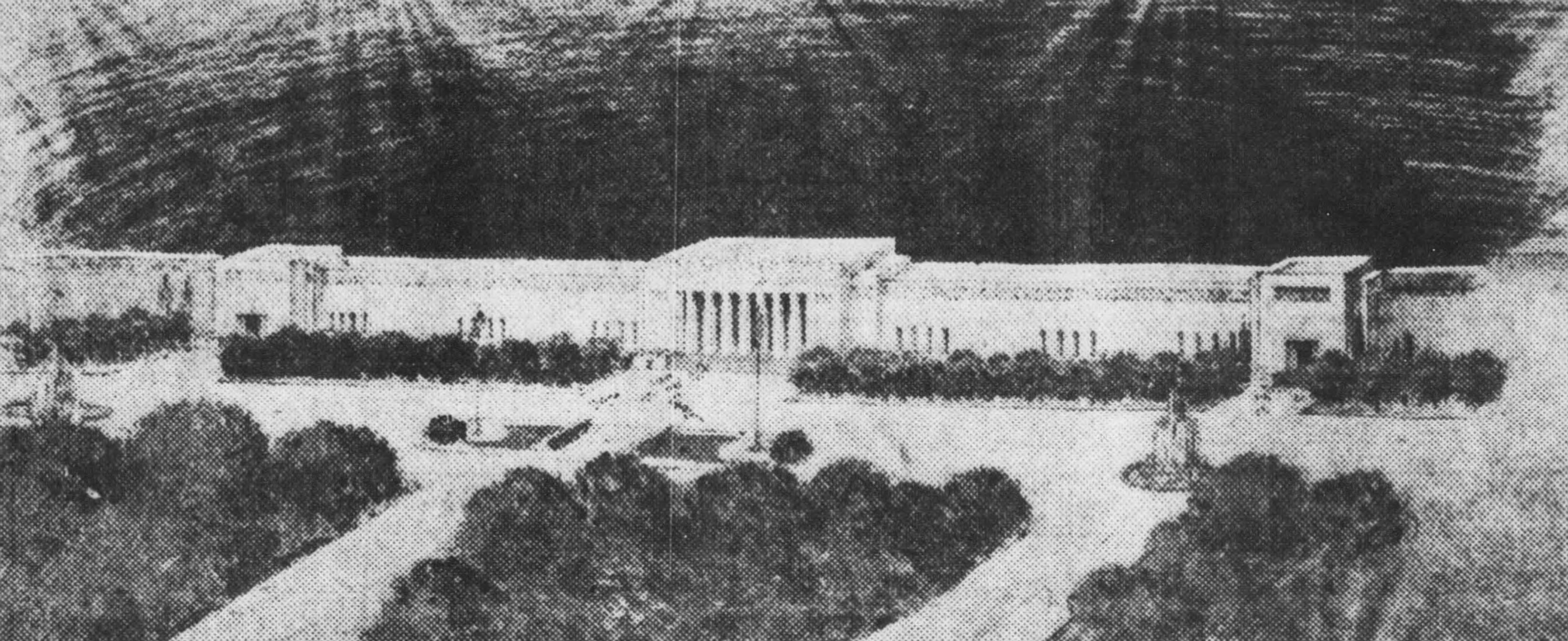
Architects' rendering of the planned Riverside Stadium published in the Washington Evening Star in 1930

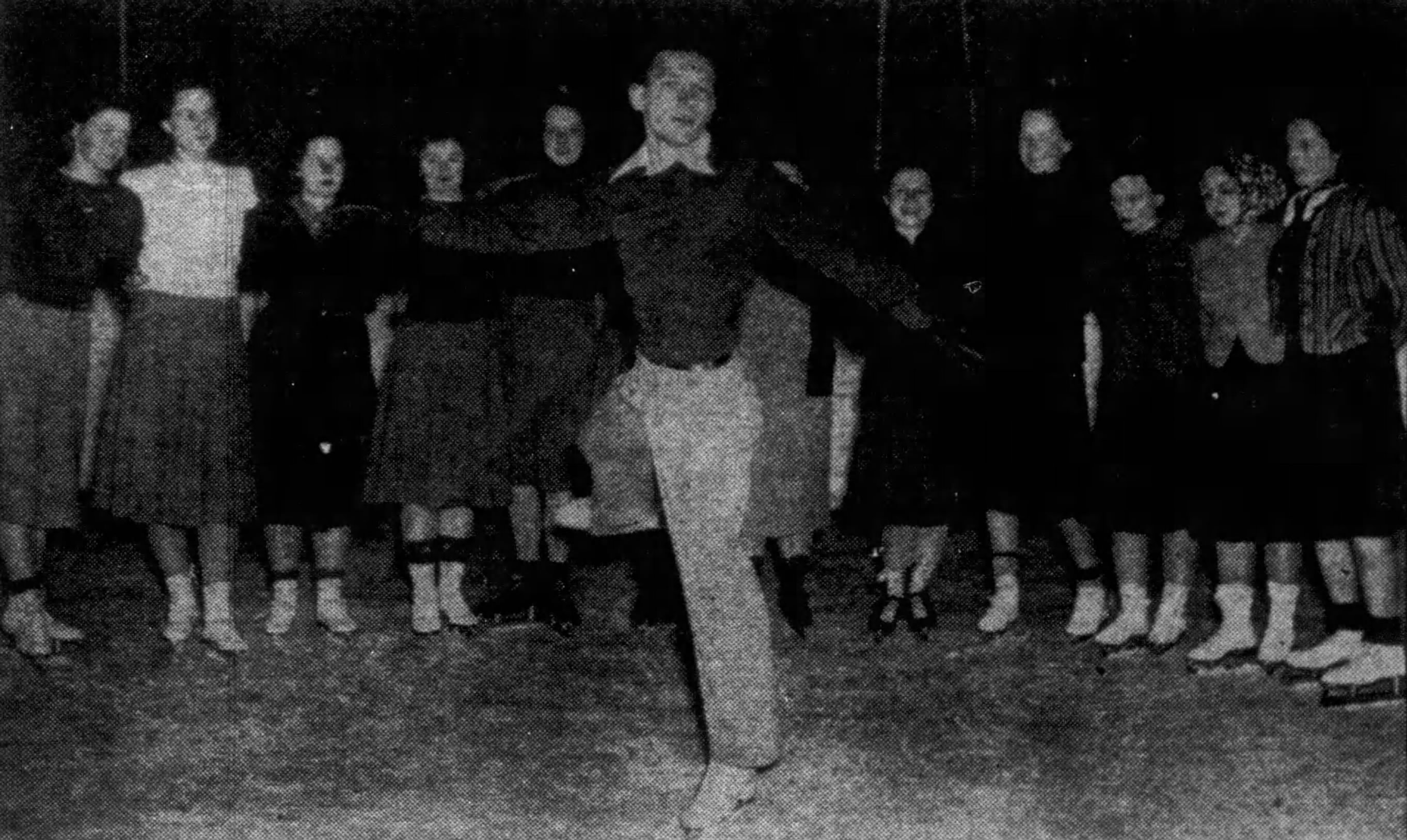
Robin Scott (center) instructs George Washington University students in ice skating, December 1939

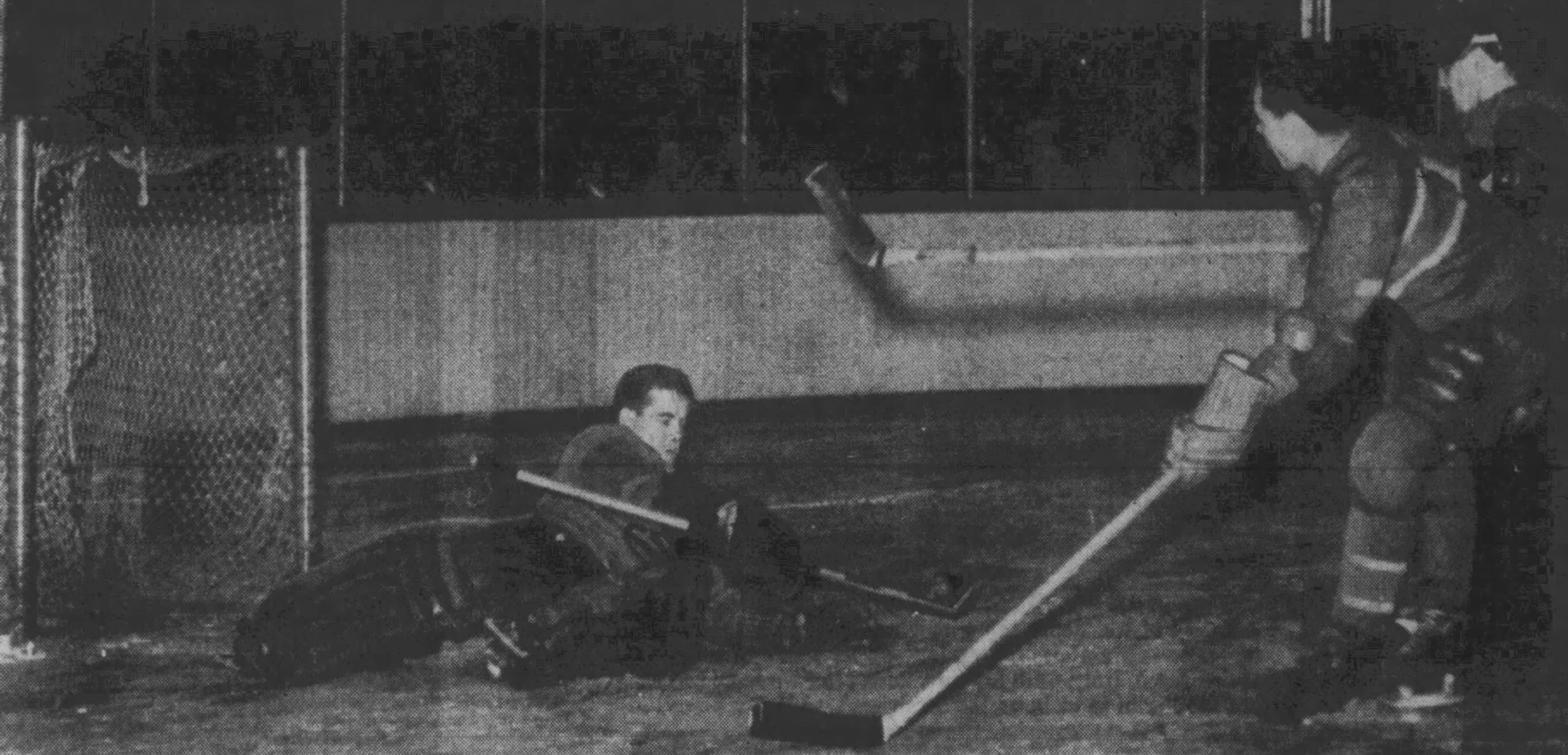
Baltimore Orioles goalie Omar Kelly (left) blocks a shot by the Atlantic City Sea Gulls' Herb Foster on March 21, 1939 at Riverside Stadium in Washington, D.C.

Riverside Stadium was opened to the public in 1938. In the early 1940s, the stadium played host to several "ice carnivals" and was considered to be an important venue to showcase competitive skating skills. Riverside Stadium was demolished to make way for the construction of the larger landmark, the National Cultural Center. The new facility was renamed in 1964 as the John F. Kennedy Center for the Performing Arts.

=== Hosted porting events ===
- Eastern Regional Championships of the Roller Skating Rinks of the United States, May 30-June 1, 1948.
- Roller Skating Rink's Operators Association (RSROA) American Championship, July 11–16, 1949.
- Amateur Roller Skating Championship of the Roller Skating Rink's Operators Association (RSROA), July 11–16, 1949.

=== Non-sporting events hosted ===
- Democratic Forum conducted by women's division of the Democratic National Committee, on the evening of May 3, 1940.

It has been reported in various United States Supreme Court's documents that the stadium was used by Central Intelligence Agency between 1961 and 1963.
