= 1929–30 Georgetown Hoyas men's basketball team =

American college basketball season

1929–30 Georgetown Hoyas men's basketball
- Conference: Independent
- Record: 13–12
- Head coach: Bill Dudack (1st season)
- Home arena: Tech Gymnasium

The 1929–30 Georgetown Hoyas men's basketball team represented Georgetown University during the 1929–30 NCAA college basketball season. Bill Dudack coached it in his first and only season as head coach. Georgetown was an independent and, after playing its first two games at Clendenen Gymnasium on the campus of American University in Washington, D.C. – its home court the previous season – the team played its home games at Tech Gymnasium on the campus of Washington's McKinley Technical High School. It played one home game later in the season at Brookland Gymnasium on the campus of the Catholic University of America in Washington.

== Season recap ==
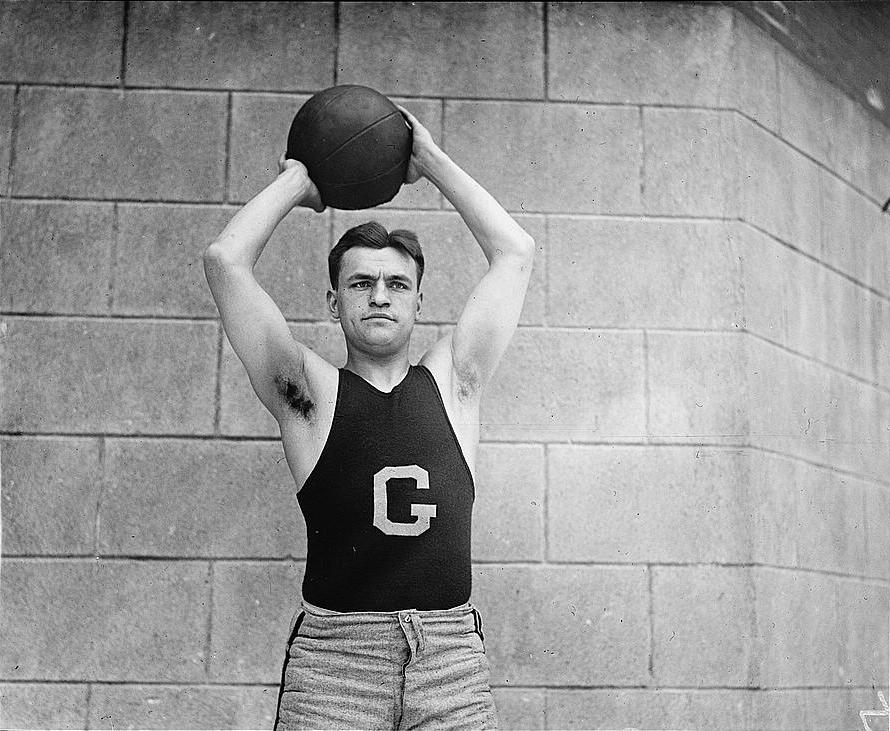
Bill Dudack, seen as a Georgetown forward in 1920, graduated in 1921 and returned to Georgetown to coach the 1929–30 team.

Bill Dudack was a 1921 Georgetown graduate who had played for four years on the varsity basketball team, beginning with the 1917–18 season and had lettered for the 1918–19, 1919–20, and 1920–21 teams. He had also been captain of the 1919–20 team. He had served as an assistant to head coach to Elmer Ripley during Ripley's two very successful seasons as the Hoyas' head coach in 1927–28 and 1928–29. Dudack inherited a team stocked with veterans Ripley had recruited, leading to hopes that Ripley's success would continue under Dudack.

Senior guard and second-year team captain Fred Mesmer was an important defensive presence for the team during the season and led the Hoyas in scoring for the second straight year, averaging 9.2 points per game. He averaged 8.5 points per game over his collegiate career.

Senior center Don Dutton scored a career-high 20 points against Johns Hopkins on January 22, 1930, and averaged 8.0 points per game through 16 games before being declared academically ineligible for the rest of the year after mid-term examinations. He focused on his studies and graduated on time in the spring of 1930.

Despite the team's veteran talent and the winning tradition the school hoped Ripley had established during the previous two years, the 1929–30 Hoyas only managed a 13–12 record. Georgetown did not rehire Dudack for the following season.

== Roster ==
Georgetown players did not wear numbers on their jerseys this season. The first numbered jerseys in Georgetown men's basketball history would not appear until the 1933–34 season.

Less than two years after graduating after the end of this season, senior guard Fred Mesmer would become Georgetown's head coach for the 1931–32 season and coach the Hoyas for seven seasons.

Name	Height	Weight (lbs.)	Position	Class	Hometown	Previous Team(s)
Chris Callan	N/A	N/A	G	Sr.	Washington, DC, U.S.	St. John's College HS
Paul Dillon	N/A	N/A	F	Jr.	N/A	N/A
Johnny Dunn	N/A	N/A	G	Sr.	Milwaukee, WI, U.S.	Marquette University HS
Don Dutton	6'2"	N/A	C	Sr.	Syracuse, NY, U.S.	Christian Brothers Academy
Jim Leavey	N/A	N/A	C	Jr.	N/A	N/A
Maurice McCarthy	N/A	N/A	G	Sr.	Stamford, CT, U.S.	N/A
Harold "Reds" Meenan	N/A	N/A	F	Sr.	New York, NY, U.S.	Loyola School
Fred Mesmer	5'8"	N/A	G	Sr.	Syracuse, NY, U.S.	Christian Brothers Academy
Walter Morris	N/A	N/A	C	Jr.	N/A	N/A
Bill Shea	N/A	N/A	F	Jr.	New York, NY, U.S.	New York University
Russell White	N/A	N/A	F	Jr.	Orange, NJ, U.S.	Seton Hall Preparatory School

== 1929–30 schedule and results ==
It was common practice at this time for colleges and universities to include non-collegiate opponents in their schedules, with the games recognized as part of their official record for the season, and the games played against the Brooklyn Knights of Columbus, the Columbus Knights of Columbus, and the Crescent Athletic Club therefore counted as part of Georgetown's won-loss record for 1929–30. It was not until 1952, after the completion of the 1951–52 season, that the National Collegiate Athletic Association (NCAA) ruled that colleges and universities could no longer count games played against non-collegiate opponents in their annual won-loss records.

Date time, TV	Opponent	Result	Record	Site city, state
Regular Season
Sat., Dec. 7, 1929 no, no	Gettysburg	L 26–33	0-1	Clendenen Gymnasium; Washington, DC
Sat., Dec. 14, 1929 no, no	Baltimore	W 39–32	1-1	Clendenen Gymnasium; Washington, DC
Fri., Dec. 27, 1929 no, no	at Columbus Knights of Columbus	W 38–30	2-1	Columbus Gymnasium; New York, NY
Sat., Dec. 28, 1929 no, no	at Crescent Athletic Club	L 24–38	2-2	Crescent Gymnasium; New York, NY
Mon., Dec. 30, 1929 no, no	at Manhattan	W 32–27	3-2	Manhattan Gymnasium; New York, NY
Wed., Jan. 1, 1930 no, no	vs. New York University; Yale Quadrangular Invitational Tournament	W 31–27	4-2	Yale Armory; New Haven, CT
Thu., Jan. 2, 1930 no, no	at Yale; Yale Quadrangular Invitational Tournament	L 23–26	4-3	Yale Armory; New Haven, CT
Tue., Jan. 7, 1930 no, no	Wake Forest	W 35–20	5-3	Tech Gymnasium; Washington, DC
Fri., Jan. 10, 1930 no, no	at West Virginia	L 27-34	5-4	WVU Field House; Morgantown, WV
Sat., Jan. 11, 1930 no, no	at Pittsburgh	L 26–43	5-5	Trees Gymnasium; Pittsburgh, PA
Wed., Jan. 15, 1930 no, no	Washington (Md.)	W 37–32	6-5	Tech Gymnasium; Washington, DC
Fri., Jan. 17, 1930 no, no	at Temple	L 24–37	6-6	Mitten Hall; Philadelphia, PA
Sat., Jan. 18, 1930 no, no	at New York University	L 27–35	6-7	University Heights Gymnasium; New York, NY
Wed., Jan. 22, 1930 no, no	Johns Hopkins	W 48-27	7-7	Tech Gymnasium; Washington, DC
Sat., Jan. 25, 1930 no, no	Mount St. Mary's	W 35-20	8-7	Tech Gymnasium; Washington, DC
Mon., Feb. 3, 1930 no, no	West Virginia	W 34–31	9-7	Tech Gymnasium; Washington, DC
Wed., Feb. 5, 1930 no, no	New York University	L 20–26	9-8	Tech Gymnasium; Washington, DC
Tue., Feb. 11, 1930 no, no	Loyola Chicago	W 34–23	10-8	Brookland Gymnasium; Washington, DC
Fri., Feb. 14, 1930 no, no	at Canisius	W 29–26	11-8	Elmwood Hall; Buffalo, NY
Sat., Feb. 15, 1930 no, no	at Syracuse; Rivalry	L 18–40	11-9	Archbold Gymnasium; Syracuse, NY
Wed., Feb. 19, 1930 no, no	at Navy	L 29–37	11-10	Dahlgren Hall; Annapolis, MD
Sat., Feb. 22, 1930 no, no	Brooklyn Knights of Columbus	W 43–27	12-10	Tech Gymnasium; Washington, DC
Fri., Feb. 28, 1930 no, no	Western Maryland	W 35–32	13-10	Tech Gymnasium; Washington, DC
Sat., Mar. 1, 1930 no, no	at Johns Hopkins	cancelled		N/A; Baltimore, MD
Thu., Mar. 6, 1930 no, no	at New York Athletic Club	cancelled		N/A; New York, NY
Fri., Mar. 7, 1930 no, no	at Columbia	L 17–45	13-11	University Gymnasium; New York, NY
Sat., Mar. 8, 1930 no, no	at Fordham	L 29–30	13-12	Rose Hill Gymnasium; Bronx, NY
*Non-conference game. (#) Tournament seedings in parentheses.
