= 1928–29 Georgetown Hoyas men's basketball team =

American college basketball season

1928–29 Georgetown Hoyas men's basketball
- Georgetown playing the Temple Owls on February 23, 1929
- Conference: Independent
- Record: 12–5
- Head coach: Elmer Ripley (2nd season)
- Captain: Fred Mesmer
- Home arena: Clendenen Gymnasium

The 1928–29 Georgetown Hoyas men's basketball team represented Georgetown University during the 1928–29 NCAA college basketball season. Elmer Ripley coached it in his second season as head coach. Georgetown was an independent and played its home games to Clendenen Gymnasium on the campus of American University in Washington, D.C., this season, the only Georgetown team to use Clendenen Gymnasium as its home court, although Georgetown played a handful of games there early the next season. It finished the season with a record of 12–5.

== Season recap ==
Junior guard and team captain Fred Mesmer had become a starter and team leader in his first varsity season the previous year. He was an important defensive presence for the team during the season and an excellent passer. He led the Hoyas in scoring, averaging 8.5 points per game.

Junior center Don Dutton, who had emerged as a standout the previous season, moved to forward in a notable 33–17 Georgetown victory at Yale on January 2, 1929, in the opening game of the Yale Quadrangular Invitational Tournament. Ten days later, he played a key role in what at the time was perhaps the greatest comeback in Georgetown men's basketball history, scoring 15 of the Hoyas' last 17 points as Georgetown came back from a 13-point deficit against Penn State with five minutes left in the game to win 42–40. Like Mesmer, Dutton finished the year averaging 8.5 points per game.

Ironically, Ripley's display of his coaching abilities in the big win at Yale so impressed Yale that Yale hired Ripley away from Georgetown; after two very successful seasons as the Hoyas' head coach in which he had an overall record of 24–6, Ripley left Georgetown at the end of the season to take the head coaching position at Yale. Destined to become a legend in college basketball, he would return to coach Georgetown two more times over a total of eight more seasons, from 1938 to 1943 – leading the Hoyas to the final game of the 1943 NCAA Tournament in the latter season – and again from 1946 to 1949. Meanwhile, Georgetown hired his assistant Bill Dudack to coach the team the following season.

== Roster ==
Georgetown players did not wear numbers on their jerseys this season. The first numbered jerseys in Georgetown men's basketball history would not appear until the 1933–34 season, Junior guard Fred Mesmer would become Georgetown's head coach for the 1931–32 season and coach the Hoyas for seven seasons.

| Name | Height | Weight (lbs.) | Position | Class | Hometown | Previous Team(s) |
|---|---|---|---|---|---|---|
| Johnny Byrnes | N/A | N/A | G | Sr. | Short Hills, NJ, U.S. | Xavier HS |
| Paul Dillon | N/A | N/A | F | So. | N/A | N/A |
| Johnny Dunn | N/A | N/A | G | Jr. | Milwaukee, WI, U.S. | Marquette University HS |
| Don Dutton | 6'2" | N/A | C | Jr. | Syracuse, NY, U.S. | Christian Brothers Academy |
| Jim Leavey | N/A | N/A | C | So. | N/A | N/A |
| Maurice McCarthy | N/A | N/A | G | Jr. | Stamford, CT, U.S. | N/A |
| Harold "Reds" Meenan | N/A | N/A | F | Jr. | New York, NY, U.S. | Loyola School |
| Fred Mesmer | 5'8" | N/A | G | Jr. | Syracuse, NY, U.S. | Christian Brothers Academy |
| Walter Morris | N/A | N/A | C | So. | N/A | N/A |
| John Scalzi | 5'7" | N/A | G | So. | Stamford, CT, U.S. | N/A |
| Bill Shea | N/A | N/A | F | So. | New York, NY, U.S. | New York University |

== 1928–29 schedule and results ==
It was common practice at this time for colleges and universities to include non-collegiate opponents in their schedules, with the games recognized as part of their official record for the season, and the games played against the Crescent Athletic Club and the New York Athletic Club therefore counted as part of Georgetown's won-loss record for 1928–29. It was not until 1952, after the completion of the 1951–52 season, that the National Collegiate Athletic Association (NCAA) ruled that colleges and universities could no longer count games played against non-collegiate opponents in their annual won-loss records.

| Date time, TV | Opponent | Result | Record | Site city, state |
Regular Season
| Sat., Dec. 8, 1928 no, no | Baltimore | W 38–26 | 1-0 | Clendenen Gymnasium; Washington, DC |
| Tue., Dec. 11, 1928 no, no | Western Maryland | W 38–23 | 2-0 | Clendenen Gymnasium; Washington, DC |
| Sat., Dec. 15, 1928 no, no | Lafayette | W 47–24 | 3-0 | Clendenen Gymnasium; Washington, DC |
| Thu., Dec. 27, 1928 no, no | at Brooklyn Knights of Columbus | cancelled | | N/A; New York, NY |
| Sat., Dec. 29, 1928 no, no | at Crescent Athletic Club | L 29–47 | 3-1 | Crescent Gymnasium; New York, NY |
| Wed., Jan. 2, 1929 no, no | at Yale; Yale Quadrangular Invitational Tournament | W 33–17 | 4-1 | Yale Armory; New Haven, CT |
| Thu., Jan. 3, 1929 no, no | vs. New York University; Yale Quadrangular Invitational Tournament | L 24–32 | 4-2 | Yale Armory; New Haven, CT |
| Fri., Jan. 4, 1929 no, no | at New York Athletic Club | W 28–20 | 5-2 | New York Athletic Club Gymnasium; New York, NY |
| Tue., Jan. 8, 1929 no, no | Duke | W 48-33 | 6-2 | Clendenen Gymnasium; Washington, DC |
| Sat., Jan. 12, 1929 no, no | Penn State | W 42–40 | 7-2 | Clendenen Gymnasium; Washington, DC |
| Sat., Jan. 19, 1929 no, no | Johns Hopkins | W 58–20 | 8-2 | Clendenen Gymnasium; Washington, DC |
| Sat., Jan. 26, 1929 no, no | Mount St. Mary's | W 33–19 | 9-2 | Clendenen Gymnasium; Washington, DC |
| Fri., Feb. 8, 1929 no, no | at New York Athletic Club | W 27–26 | 10-2 | New York Athletic Club Gymnasium; New York, NY |
| Sat., Feb. 9, 1929 no, no | at New York University | L 30-32 ^{OT} | 10-3 | University Heights Gymnasium; New York, NY |
| Tue., Feb. 12, 1929 no, no | at Johns Hopkins | W 38-35 ^{OT} | 11-3 | N/A; Baltimore, MD |
| Sat., Feb. 16, 1929 no, no | West Virginia | L 44–49 | 11-4 | Clendenen Gymnasium; Washington, DC |
| Wed., Feb. 20, 1929 no, no | at Navy | W 29–21 | 12-4 | Dahlgren Hall; Annapolis, MD |
| Sat., Feb. 23, 1929 no, no | at Temple | L 24–27 | 12-5 | Mitten Hall; Philadelphia, PA |
*Non-conference game. (#) Tournament seedings in parentheses.
