= 1948–49 Georgetown Hoyas men's basketball team =

American college basketball season

1948–49 Georgetown Hoyas men's basketball
- Conference: Independent
- Record: 9–15
- Head coach: Elmer Ripley (10th season)
- Captain: Ray Corley
- Home arena: D.C. Armory

The 1948–49 Georgetown Hoyas men's basketball team represented Georgetown University during the 1948–49 NCAA college basketball season. Elmer Ripley coached it in his tenth season as head coach, the third season of his third stint at the helm. The team was an independent and played its home games for a second and final season at the D.C. Armory in Washington, D.C. It finished with a record of 9–15 and had no post-season play.

== Season recap ==
Senior guard Tommy O'Keefe and senior forward Ray Corley were the stars of the team. O'Keefe was the team's top scorer for a second straight season, with a season high of 22 points in the game against the New York Athletic Club.

The 1948–49 squad started 6–3 but then lost 12 of its last 15 games to finish with a record of 9–15 – the least successful team in Ripley's ten Georgetown seasons – and had no post-season play. It was not ranked in the Top 20 in the Associated Press Poll – conducted for the first time this season – at any time.

Considered a legend in basketball, Ripley departed at the end of the season, having coached the Hoyas in three separate stints (1927–1929, 1938–1943, and 1946–1949) with an overall record of 133–82, including what was then the school's only appearance in a postseason tournament when the 1942–43 team advanced to the final game of the 1943 NCAA Tournament. He was head coach of John Carroll from 1949 to 1951, Army from 1951 to 1953, the Harlem Globetrotters from 1953 to 1956, the Israeli Olympic basketball team in 1956, and the Canadian Olympic basketball team in 1960.

== Roster ==
Senior guard Tommy O'Keefe would later serve as Georgetown's assistant coach for four seasons from 1956 to 1960 and as head coach for six seasons from 1960 to 1966.

#	Name	Height	Weight (lbs.)	Position	Class	Hometown	Previous Team(s)
9	Italo Ablondi	6'0"		G	Jr.	New York, NY, U.S.	Stuyvesant HS
13	Dick Falvey	6'0"		G	Jr.	New York, NY, U.S.	La Salle Academy
15	Ken "Bud" Brown	6'4"		F	Sr.	Muncie, IN, U.S.	Burris Laboratory School
16	Tommy O'Keefe	6'0"		G	Sr.	Jersey City, NJ, U.S.	University of Notre Dame
17	Ray Corley	6'2"		F	Sr.	New York, NY, U.S.	La Salle HS
26	Vin Leddy	5'11"		G	Sr.	New York, NY, U.S.	Saint Francis High School
28	John Mazziotta	6'5"		F	So.	New York, NY, U.S.	N/A
35	Johnny Brown	6'3"		C/F	Jr.	Staten Island, NY, U.S.	Tottenville, NY
36	Frank Alagia	6'1"		F	Jr.	New York, NY, U.S.	Andrew Jackson HS|33
N/A	Joe Culhane	N/A		G	Sr.	Rochester, NY, U.S.	University of Rochester
N/A	Danny Supkis	6'7"		F	Jr.	New York, NY, U.S.	St. Alban's HS

== 1948–49 schedule and results ==
It was common practice at this time for colleges and universities to include non-collegiate opponents in their schedules, with the games recognized as part of their official record for the season, and the games played against a United States Army team from Fort Belvoir, Virginia, and the New York Athletic Club therefore counted as part of Georgetown's won-loss record for 1948–49. It was not until 1952 after the completion of the 1951–52 season that the National Collegiate Athletic Association (NCAA) ruled that colleges and universities could no longer count games played against non-collegiate opponents in their annual won-loss records.

Date time, TV	Rank^{#}	Opponent^{#}	Result	Record	Site city, state
Regular Season
Tue., Dec. 7, 1948 no, no		Fort Belvoir	W 91–51	1-0	D.C. Armory; Washington, DC
Sat., Dec. 11, 1948 no, no		at New York University	L 59–70	1-1	Madison Square Garden; New York, NY
Wed., Dec. 15, 1948 no, no		Penn State	W 49–40	2-1	D.C. Armory; Washington, DC
Fri., Dec. 31, 1948 no, no		at John Carroll	W 73–53	3-1	Cleveland Arena; Cleveland, OH
N/A no, no		vs. St. Bonaventure	L 50–59	3-2	Buffalo Memorial Auditorium; Buffalo, NY
Fri., Jan. 7, 1949 no, no		at William & Mary	L 58–69	3-3	George Preston Blow Gymnasium; Williamsburg, VA
Sat., Jan. 8, 1949 no, no		at Richmond	W 69–44	4-3	Richmond Arena; Richmond, VA
Mon., Jan. 10, 1949 no, no		Maryland	W 53–51	5-3	D.C. Armory; Washington, DC
Wed., Jan. 12, 1949 no, no		at George Washington	W 53–49	6-3	D.C. Armory; Washington, DC
Sun., Jan. 16, 1949 no, no		at Canisius	L 43–52	6-4	Buffalo Memorial Auditorium; Buffalo, NY
Mon., Jan. 17, 1949 no, no		vs. Lafayette	L 48–56	6-5	Alumni Gymnasium; Baltimore, MD
Fri., Jan. 28, 1949 no, no		No. 8 Villanova	L 49–64	6-6	D.C. Armory; Washington, DC
Wed., Feb. 2, 1949 no, no		Lafayette	W 68–60	7-6	D.C. Armory; Washington, DC
Sat., Feb. 5, 1949 no, no		St. John's	L 54–65	7-7	D.C. Armory; Washington, DC
Wed., Feb. 8, 1949 no, no		at Pennsylvania	L 53–56	7-8	Palestra; Philadelphia, PA
Sat., Feb. 12, 1949 no, no		Seton Hall	L 53–70	7-9	D.C. Armory; Washington, DC
Tue., Feb. 15, 1949 no, no		at Holy Cross	L 56–74	7-10	Boston Arena; Boston, MA
Thu., Feb. 17, 1949 no, no		at Maryland	W 56–52	8-10	Ritchie Coliseum; College Park, MD
Sat., Feb. 19, 1949 no, no		at La Salle	L 45–62	8-11	Philadelphia Convention Hall; Philadelphia, PA
Wed., Feb. 23, 1949 no, no		George Washington	L 42–57	8-12	D.C. Armory; Washington, DC
N/A no, no		at New York Athletic Club	W 64–55	9-12	New York Athletic Club Gymnasium; New York, NY
N/A no, no		at Siena	L 39–44	9-13	Washington Avenue Armory; Albany, NY
Sat., Mar. 5, 1949 no, no		at Penn State	L 42–61	9-14	Recreation Hall; State College, PA
Mon., Mar. 7, 1949 no, no		at No. 14 Villanova	L 57–65	9-15	Villanova Field House; Villanova, PA
*Non-conference game. ^{#}Rankings from AP Poll. (#) Tournament seedings in parentheses.
