= 1938–39 Georgetown Hoyas men's basketball team =

American college basketball season

1938–39 Georgetown Hoyas men's basketball

Eastern Intercollegiate Conference Regular Season Co-Champions
- Conference: Eastern Intercollegiate Conference
- Record: 13–9 (6-4 EIC)
- Head coach: Elmer Ripley (3rd season)
- Captain: Joe Murphy
- Home arena: Tech Gymnasium

1938–39 Eastern Intercollegiate Conference men's basketball standings
	Conf.				Overall
Team	W		L	PCT	W		L	PCT
Carnegie Tech	6	–	4	.600	12	–	7	.632
Georgetown	6	–	4	.600	13	–	9	.591
Penn State	5	–	5	.500	13	–	10	.565
Pittsburgh	5	–	5	.500	10	–	8	.556
West Virginia	4	–	6	.400	10	–	9	.526
Temple	4	–	6	.400	10	–	12	.455

The 1938–39 Georgetown Hoyas men's basketball team represented Georgetown University during the 1938–39 NCAA college basketball season. Elmer Ripley, who had coached Georgetown previously from 1927 to 1929, returned for his second of three stints as head coach; it was his third season overall as the Hoyas' head coach. The team was a member of the Eastern Intercollegiate Conference (EIC) and played its home games at Tech Gymnasium on the campus of McKinley Technical High School in Washington, D.C. The team finished as conference co-champion, with a record of 6–4 in the EIC and 13–9 overall. It had no postseason play.

== Season recap ==
Senior forward Joe Murphy was the team's star. He scored in double figures in nine games, including 14 points against Syracuse, 11 against Maryland, and 15 against EIC rival Penn State. He finished the season averaging a career-high 8.9 points per game. Over his career, he was the second-highest scoring Georgetown player of the 1930s and fifth-highest in school history at the time. He had scored in double figures in 17 of the 65 games of his three-year college varsity career.

Junior forward John Schmitt scored 12 points in an upset of West Virginia in an EIC game. His season ended when he broke his leg during the game at Yale.

Georgetown finished with an overall record of 13–9, the most wins by a Georgetown team since the 1929–30 season and the best winning percentage since 1928–29. The school had been a founding member of the EIC when the conference began play in the 1932–33 season, and this year's 6–4 conference record gave the school its first and only regular-season EIC championship – Georgetown's first championship of any kind – which it shared with Carnegie Tech. Although the EIC never held a postseason conference tournament, in previous seasons when the regular season had ended in a first-place tie it had held a single postseason playoff game between the two first-place teams to determine the conference championship. This season, however, no such playoff game took place, and Georgetown and Carnegie Tech settled for the only co-championship in EIC history.

Although the Associated Press described the Eastern Intercollegiate Conference as "one of the best in the nation," its members agreed to disband it at the end of the season because geographical problems had made scheduling difficult. Georgetown's overall conference record during its seven-year membership was 27–39.

At the end of the season, Georgetown thus became an independent again for the first time since the 1931–32 season. In 1939–40, the Hoyas would play their first of 38 seasons as an independent before becoming a founding member of the original Big East Conference in the 1979–1980 season.

== Roster ==
Junior guard Francis "Reds" Daly was killed in action in the Battle of Iwo Jima on February 22, 1945, during World War II military service.

#	Name	Height	Weight (lbs.)	Position	Class	Hometown	Previous Team(s)
3	Joe Murphy	6'0"	N/A	F	Sr.	West New York, NJ, U.S.	Memorial HS
10	Joe McFadden	N/A	N/A	G	So.	N/A	N/A
12	Jim Giebel	N/A	N/A	G	So.	Bethesda, MD, U.S.	St. John's College HS (Washington, DC)
13	George Pajak	6'0"	N/A	G/F	So.	Ware, MA, U.S.	Ware HS
20	Irv Rizzi	N/A	N/A	G	So.	West New York, NJ, U.S.	Memorial HS
24	Al Matuza	6'2"	N/A	F	So.	Shenandoah, PA, U.S.	Shenandoah HS
53	Ed Kurtyka	N/A	N/A	G	Sr.	Washington, DC, U.S.	Eastern HS
60	Francis "Reds" Daly	6'3"	N/A	G	Jr.	Washington, DC, U.S.	McKinley Technical HS
80	John Schmitt	5'11"	N/A	F	Jr.	Syracuse, NY, U.S.	St. John's Preparatory School (New York, NY)
N/A	Harry Leber	N/A	N/A	G	Sr.	N/A	N/A
N/A	John McGowan	N/A	N/A	C	N/A	N/A	N/A
N/A	John Riches	N/A	N/A	G	Sr.	N/A	N/A

== 1938–39 schedule and results ==
Date time, TV	Opponent	Result	Record	Site city, state
Regular Season
Thu., Dec. 8, 1938* no, no	Western Maryland	W 46–23	1-0	Tech Gymnasium; Washington, DC
Tue., Dec. 13, 1938* no, no	Loyola Maryland	W 36–34	2-0	Tech Gymnasium; Washington, DC
Thu., Dec. 15, 1938* no, no	at American	W 51–35	3-0	Clendenen Gymnasium; Washington, DC
Wed., Jan. 4, 1939* no, no	at New York University	W 27–25	4-0	Madison Square Garden; New York, NY
Mon., Jan. 9, 1938 no, no	Temple	W 36–28	5-0 (1-0)	Tech Gymnasium; Washington, D.C.
Fri, Jan. 13, 1939 no, no	at Carnegie Tech	L 34–37	5-1 (1-1)	Skibo Gymnasium; Pittsburgh, PA
Sat., Jan. 14, 1938 no, no	at West Virginia	W 37–31	6-1 (2-1)	WVU Field House; Morgantown, WV
Thu., Jan. 19, 1939* no, no	at Loyola Maryland	W 39–30	7-1	Alumni Gymnasium; Baltimore, MD
Fri., Jan. 27, 1939* no, no	at New York University	L 43–45	7-2	102nd Regiment Armory; New York, NY
Sat., Jan. 28, 1939* no, no	at Syracuse; Rivalry	L 43–45	7-3	Archbold Gymnasium; Syracuse, NY
Tue., Jan. 31, 1939* no, no	at Fordham	L 34–43	7-4	Rose Hill Gymnasium; Bronx, NY
Wed, Feb. 1, 1939* no, no	at Army	L 17–36	7-5	Hayes Gymnasium; West Point, NY
Mon., Feb. 6, 1939 no, no	West Virginia	W 40–32	8-5 (3-1)	Tech Gymnasium; Washington, DC
Wed., Feb. 8, 1939* no, no	at Maryland	W 39–25	9-5	Ritchie Coliseum; College Park, MD
Sat., Feb. 11, 1939 no, no	at Penn State	W 32–21	10-5 (4-1)	Recreation Hall; State College, PA
Mon., Feb. 13, 1939 no, no	at Pittsburgh	L 41–43	10-6 (4-2)	Pitt Pavilion; Pittsburgh, PA
Thu., Feb. 16, 1939 no, no	Carnegie Tech	W 45–41 ^{OT}	11-6 (5-2)	Tech Gymnasium; Washington, DC
Fri., Feb. 24, 1939 no, no	at Temple	L 25–32	11-7 (5-3)	Philadelphia Convention Hall; Philadelphia, PA
Sat., Feb. 25, 1939* no, no	at Yale	W 20–19	12-7	Payne Whitney Gymnasium; New Haven, CT
Wed., Mar. 1, 1939 no, no	Penn State	W 42–29	13-7 (6-3)	Tech Gymnasium; Washington, DC
Sat., Mar. 4, 1939 no, no	Pittsburgh	L 39–44	13-8 (6-4)	Tech Gymnasium; Washington, DC
Tue., Mar. 7, 1939* no, no	George Washington	L 26–36	13-9	Tech Gymnasium; Washington, DC
*Non-conference game. (#) Tournament seedings in parentheses.
