= 1939–40 Georgetown Hoyas men's basketball team =

American college basketball season

1939–40 Georgetown Hoyas men's basketball
- Conference: Independent
- Record: 8–10
- Head coach: Elmer Ripley (4th season)
- Captain: John Schmitt
- Home arena: Tech Gymnasium

The 1939–40 Georgetown Hoyas men's basketball team represented Georgetown University during the 1939–40 NCAA college basketball season. Elmer Ripley coached it in his fourth of ten seasons as head coach; it was also the second season of his second of three stints at the helm. The team played its home games at Tech Gymnasium on the campus of McKinley Technical High School in Washington, D.C. The team finished with a record of 8–10 and had no postseason play.

== Season recap ==
Following the demise of the Eastern Intercollegiate Conference after the end of the previous season, Georgetown returned to an independent status. Beginning this season – its first as an independent since 1931–32 – it would play 38 seasons as an independent before becoming a founding member of the original Big East Conference in the 1979–1980 season.

The 1939–40 Hoyas were a young team, with only two seniors on the roster. New to the team was sophomore guard Buddy O'Grady. He averaged 4.9 points per game for the season and became a leader on the court, and would be a star for the Hoyas for three seasons.

The team became a part of television broadcasting history on February 28, 1940, when television station W2XBS broadcast a men's basketball doubleheader from Madison Square Garden in New York City. Fordham and Pittsburgh played in the first game, and New York University played Georgetown in the second game. It was the first time in history that college basketball was televised.

The 1939–40 Hoyas had a difficult season, finishing with an 8–10 record and no post-season play. Senior forward Al Lujack went on to play professionally for one season with the Washington Capitals of the Basketball Association of America.

== Roster ==
Sophomore guard Buddy O'Grady would later serve as the Hoyas' head coach from 1949 to 1952.

Sophomore guard Don Martin served as head coach at Boston College from 1953 to 1962.

Senior guard Francis "Reds" Daly was killed in action in the Battle of Iwo Jima on February 22, 1945, during World War II military service.

#	Name	Height	Weight (lbs.)	Position	Class	Hometown	Previous Team(s)
3	Jim Kiernan	6'0"	N/A	F	So.	New York, NY, U.S.	Saint Simon High School
4	John Dieckelman (or Dieckleman)	6'0"	N/A	G	So.	Albany, NY, U.S.	Vincentian High School
11	Russ Miller	N/A	N/A	F/C	So.	Passaic, NJ, U.S.	Passaic High School
12	Jim Giebel	N/A	N/A	G	Jr.	Bethesda, MD, U.S.	St. John's College High School (Washington, DC)
13	George Pajak	6'0"	N/A	G/F	Jr.	Ware, MA, U.S.	Ware Junior Senior High School
18	Francis "Buddy" O'Grady	N/A	160	G	So.	New York, NY, U.S.	St. Peter's Boys High School
20	Irv Rizzi	N/A	N/A	G	Jr.	West New York, NJ, U.S.	Memorial High School
24	Al Matuza	6'2"	N/A	F	Jr.	Shenandoah, PA, U.S.	Shenandoah High School
43	Don Martin	5'8"	N/A	G	So.	Newport, RI, U.S.	La Salle Academy
49	Al Lujack	6'3"	N/A	F	Sr.	Connellsville, PA, U.S.	Connellsville High School
60	Francis "Reds" Daly	6'3"	N/A	G	Sr.	Washington, DC, U.S.	McKinley Technical High School
80	John Schmitt	5'11"	N/A	C	Sr.	Syracuse, NY, U.S.	St. John's Preparatory School (New York, NY)

== 1939–40 schedule and results ==
Date time, TV	Opponent	Result	Record	Site city, state
Regular Season
Sun., Dec. 3, 1939 no, no	at Baltimore	L 34–40	0-1	N/A; Baltimore, MD
Wed., Dec. 6, 1939 no, no	Western Maryland	W 52–34	1-1	Tech Gymnasium; Washington, DC
Thu., Dec. 14, 1939 no, no	at American	W 44–30	2-1	Clendenen Gymnasium; Washington, DC
Fri., Jan. 5, 1940 no, no	at Temple	L 28–38	2-2	Philadelphia Convention Hall; Philadelphia, PA
Sat., Jan. 6, 1940 no, no	at George Washington	L 40–49	2-3	Riverside Stadium; Washington, D.C.
Wed, Jan. 10, 1940 no, no	at Penn State	L 22–33	2-4	Recreation Hall; State College, PA
Fri., Jan. 12, 1940 no, no	at Scranton	L 31–33	2-5	Watres Armory; Scranton, PA
Wed., Jan 17, 1940 no, no	at Maryland	L 40–28	2-6	Ritchie Coliseum; College Park, MD
Sat., Jan. 27, 1940 no, no	Loyola Maryland	W 65–37	3-6	Tech Gymnasium; Washington, DC
Wed., Jan. 31, 1940 no, no	at Army	W 35–34	4-6	Hayes Gymnasium; West Point, NY
Thu., Feb. 1, 1940 no, no	at Syracuse; Rivalry	L 33–38	4-7	Archbold Gymnasium; Syracuse, NY
Fri., Feb. 2, 1940 no, no	at Colgate	L 34–39	4-8	Huntington Gymnasium; Hamilton, NY
Wed., Feb. 7, 1940 no, no	Temple	W 34–31	5-8	Tech Gymnasium; Washington, DC
Mon., Feb. 12, 1940 no, no	West Virginia	L 38–40	5-9	Tech Gymnasium; Washington, DC
Thu., Feb. 15, 1940 no, no	American	W 42–32	6-9	Tech Gymnasium; Washington, DC
Wed, Feb. 21, 1940 no, no	Penn State	W 38–35	7-9	Tech Gymnasium; Washington, DC
Wed., Feb. 28, 1940 no, no	at New York University	L 27–50	7-10	Madison Square Garden; New York, NY
Wed., Mar. 6, 1940 no, no	George Washington	W 43–39	8-10	Tech Gymnasium; Washington, DC
*Non-conference game. (#) Tournament seedings in parentheses.
