= 1930–31 Georgetown Hoyas men's basketball team =

American college basketball season

1930–31 Georgetown Hoyas men's basketball
- Conference: Independent
- Record: 5–16
- Head coach: John Colrick (1st season)
- Captain: Walter Morris
- Home arena: Tech Gymnasium

The 1930–31 Georgetown Hoyas men's basketball team represented Georgetown University during the 1930–31 NCAA college basketball season. John Colrick coached it in his first and only season as head coach. Georgetown was an independent and played its home games at Tech Gymnasium on the campus of McKinley Technical High School in Washington, D.C., except for one home game it played at Ryan Gymnasium on the Georgetown campus. It finished with a record of 5–16.

== Season recap ==
After the Hoyas' disappointing 13–12 record the previous season, Georgetown had hired Colrick from his alma mater, Notre Dame, to serve as a football assistant and, following that, to take over as the Hoyas' head basketball coach. At Notre Dame, he had assisted head coach George Keogan; employing an up-tempo offense known as the "Western-style" offense, Keogan never had a losing season in his 20 years as Notre Dame's head coach between 1923 and 1943. Georgetown's athletics department hoped that Colrick would bring a successful version of the "Western-style" offense to Georgetown, but the team instead performed very poorly, finishing with a record of 5–16. Its .238 winning percentage was the worst in Georgetown men's basketball history until the 1971–72 team finished with a 3–23 record and .115 winning percentage.

Colrick left Georgetown shortly after the end of the season and spent a single season coaching basketball at Seton Hall the following year. His career after that is obscure.

Georgetown deemphasized sports during the 1930s, and this season began a period of mediocrity in Georgetown basketball that stretched throughout the decade. From the beginning of this season through the end of the 1939–40 season, Georgetown would have a combined record of 32 games under .500, with only three winning seasons.

== Roster ==
Georgetown players did not wear numbers on their jerseys this season. The first numbered jerseys in Georgetown men's basketball history would not appear until the 1933–34 season.

| Name | Height | Weight (lbs.) | Position | Class | Hometown | Previous Team(s) |
|---|---|---|---|---|---|---|
| Emil Bosek (or Bozek) | N/A | N/A | G | Jr. | Nashua, NH, U.S. | Nashua HS |
| Johnny Bosek (or Bozek) | N/A | N/A | F | Sr. | Nashua, NH, U.S. | Nashua HS |
| Paul Dillon | N/A | N/A | F | Sr. | N/A | N/A |
| Dick King | N/A | N/A | G | Jr. | New York, NY, U.S. | St. Peter's Preparatory School |
| Jim Leavey | N/A | N/A | C | Sr. | N/A | N/A |
| Jim Maczees | 5'9" | N/A | G | Jr. | Shenandoah, PA, U.S. | J. W. Cooper HS |
| Tom "Jack" McHale | N/A | N/A | F | Jr. | Trenton, NJ, U.S. | N/A |
| Walter Morris | N/A | N/A | C | Sr. | N/A | N/A |
| Vernon Murphy | N/A | N/A | F | So. | N/A | N/A |
| John Scalzi | 5'7" | N/A | G | Sr. | Stamford, CT, U.S. | N/A |
| Bill Shea | N/A | N/A | F | Sr. | New York, NY, U.S. | New York University |

== 1930–31 schedule and results ==
It was common practice at this time for colleges and universities to include non-collegiate opponents in their schedules, with the games recognized as part of their official record for the season, and the games played against the Crescent Athletic Club and the Brooklyn Knights of Columbus therefore counted as part of Georgetown's won-loss record for 1930–31. It was not until 1952, after the completion of the 1951–52 season, that the National Collegiate Athletic Association (NCAA) ruled that colleges and universities could no longer count games played against non-collegiate opponents in their annual won-loss records.

| Date time, TV | Opponent | Result | Record | Site city, state |
Regular Season
| Fri., Dec. 12, 1930 no, no | Gettysburg | W 35–27 | 1-0 | Tech Gymnasium; Washington, DC |
| Sat., Dec. 13, 1930 no, no | Baltimore | W 37–29 | 2-0 | Tech Gymnasium; Washington, DC |
| Fri., Dec. 26, 1930 no, no | at Brooklyn Knights of Columbus | L 21–26 | 2-1 | N/A; New York, NY |
| Sat., Dec. 27, 1930 no, no | at Crescent Athletic Club | L 26–41 | 2-2 | N/A; New York, NY |
| Mon., Dec. 29, 1930 no, no | at Manhattan | L 22–23 | 2-3 | Manhattan Gymnasium; New York, NY |
| Tue., Dec. 30, 1930 no, no | at St. John's | L 19–26 | 2-4 | 106th Regiment Armory; New York, NY |
| Tue., Jan. 13, 1931 no, no | at Johns Hopkins | W 30–16 | 3-4 | N/A; Baltimore, MD |
| Fri., Jan. 16, 1931 no, no | Duquesne | L 28–32 | 3-5 | Tech Gymnasium; Washington, DC |
| Sat., Jan. 17, 1931 no, no | Washington and Lee | L 27–28 | 3-6 | Tech Gymnasium; Washington, DC |
| Wed., Jan. 21, 1931 no, no | Mount St. Mary's | W 34–22 | 4-6 | Ryan Gymnasium; Washington, DC |
| Sat., Jan. 24, 1931 no, no | at New York University | L 31–34 | 4-7 | University Heights Gymnasium; New York, NY |
| Wed., Jan. 28, 1931 no, no | at Army | L 30–31 | 4-8 | Hayes Gymnasium; West Point, NY |
| Wed., Feb. 4, 1931 no, no | at Navy | L 32–45 | 4-9 | Dahlgren Hall; Annapolis, MD |
| Fri., Feb. 6, 1931 no, no | Johns Hopkins | W 30–29 | 5-9 | Tech Gymnasium; Washington, DC |
| Sat., Feb. 7, 1931 no, no | at Temple | L 38–42 | 5-10 | Mitten Hall; Philadelphia, PA |
| Mon., Feb. 9, 1931 no, no | West Virginia | L 29–35 | 5-11 | Tech Gymnasium; Washington, DC |
| Thu., Feb. 12, 1931 no, no | at West Virginia | L 22–38 | 5-12 | WVU Field House; Morgantown, WV |
| Fri., Feb. 13, 1931 no, no | at Duquesne | L 27–28 | 5-13 | Duquesne Garden; Pittsburgh, PA |
| Sat., Feb. 14, 1931 no, no | at Carnegie Tech | L 20–35 | 5-14 | Skibo Gymnasium; Pittsburgh, PA |
| Sat., Feb. 21, 1931 no, no | Brooklyn Knights of Columbus | L 23–28 | 5-15 | Tech Gymnasium; Washington, DC |
| Wed., Feb. 25, 1931 no, no | at Loyola Maryland | L 28–54 | 5-16 | Alumni Gymnasium; Baltimore, MD |
*Non-conference game. (#) Tournament seedings in parentheses.
