= 1927–28 Georgetown Hoyas men's basketball team =

American college basketball season

1927–28 Georgetown Hoyas men's basketball
- Conference: Independent
- Record: 12–1
- Head coach: Elmer Ripley (1st season)
- Captain: Bob Nork
- Home arena: Arcade Rink

The 1927–28 Georgetown Hoyas men's basketball team represented Georgetown University during the 1927–28 NCAA college basketball season. Elmer Ripley coached it in his first season as head coach. Georgetown was an independent and played its home games at the Arcade Rink, also known as the Arcadia and as the Arcade Auditorium, in Washington, D.C., which it had also used for home games from 1911 to 1914.

Ripley played professional basketball, including with the "Original Celtics," from 1908 to 1930, coached for three seasons from 1922 to 1925 at Wagner College with an overall record of 23–22, and was being pursued by George Preston Marshall's Washington Palace Five team of the professional American Basketball League in 1927 when Georgetown hired him as head coach. He immediately showed great talent for coaching, leading the Hoyas to a 12–1 record. During three separate stints as head coach, Ripley would coach Georgetown for a combined ten seasons between 1927 and 1949 and lead the school to its first post-season tournament appearance when it advanced to the final game of the 1943 NCAA Tournament.

== Season recap ==
On-campus Ryan Gymnasium, where the Hoyas had played their home games from the 1914–15 season through the 1926–27 season, had no seating, accommodating fans on a standing-room only-basis on an indoor track above the court. This precluded the accommodation of significant crowds, providing the self-sustaining Basketball Association with little revenue with which to fund the team's travel expenses and limiting Georgetown to an average of no more than three road games a year from the 1918-19 season through the previous season. Georgetown Athletic Director Lou Little allowed Ripley to schedule home games off campus this season for the first time since the 1913-14 season in order to generate greater revenue to pay for travel expenses; although this season the Hoyas continued the pattern of playing virtually all of their games at home, they would finally begin to travel more regularly again the following season. It was the Arcade Rink's last season hosting Georgetown men's basketball games, but it was only the first of 22 straight seasons of off-campus home games for the Hoyas, who would not have an on-campus home court again until the opening of McDonough Arena for the 1951–52 season.

Senior forward and team captain Bob Nork was the team's leader for the third straight year, playing in all 13 games, scoring 97 points, and averaging 7.2 points per game. He averaged 8.8 points per game over his collegiate career.

Sophomore guard Fred Mesmer joined the team this season and immediately became a starter and one of the team's leaders. He was an important defensive presence for the team during the season and a skilled passer. He scored in all 13 games, averaging 7.1 points per game.

Sophomore center Don Dutton, Mesmer's high school teammate, also joined the team this year. He started every game and was a strong rebounder and offensive player. His average of 8.8 points per game was the highest for a Georgetown center since the 1907-08 season.

The team's 12–1 record was the best Georgetown finish since the 1919–20 team's 13–1 season. Its only loss was to nationally renowned New York University, and its February 14, 1928, victory over Navy was Georgetown's first win over Navy since January 23, 1909, bringing to an end a 15-game Hoya losing streak against the Midshipmen.

== Roster ==
Georgetown players did not wear numbers on their jerseys this season. The first numbered jerseys in Georgetown men's basketball history would not appear until the 1933–34 season.

Sophomore guard Fred Mesmer would become Georgetown's head coach for the 1931–32 season and coach the Hoyas for seven seasons.

| Name | Height | Weight (lbs.) | Position | Class | Hometown | Previous Team(s) |
|---|---|---|---|---|---|---|
| Johnny Byrnes | N/A | N/A | G | Jr. | Short Hills, NJ, U.S. | Xavier HS |
| Chris Callan | N/A | N/A | G | So. | Washington, DC, U.S. | St. John's College HS |
| Johnny Dunn | N/A | N/A | G | So. | Milwaukee, WI, U.S. | Marquette University HS |
| Don Dutton | 6'2" | N/A | C | So. | Syracuse, NY, U.S. | Christian Brothers Academy |
| Joe Griffin | 5'8" | N/A | G | So. | Chicago, IL, U.S. | Loyola Academy |
| J. Nevins McBride | N/A | N/A | F | Jr. | Paterson, NJ, U.S. | St. Peter's Preparatory School |
| Maurice McCarthy | N/A | N/A | G | So. | Stamford, CT, U.S. | N/A |
| Harold "Reds" Meenan | N/A | N/A | F | So. | New York, NY, U.S. | Loyola School |
| Fred Mesmer | 5'8" | N/A | G | So. | Syracuse, NY, U.S. | Christian Brothers Academy |
| Bob Nork | N/A | N/A | F | Sr. | Shenandoah, PA, U.S. | Shenandoah HS |
| Ed Slezozsky | N/A | N/A | G | Sr. | Shenandoah, PA, U.S. | Shenandoah HS |

== 1927–28 schedule and results ==
Georgetown's victory at Navy this season was its first over the Midshipmen since 1909. In the interim, the Hoyas had lost 15 straight games to Navy.

| Date time, TV | Opponent | Result | Record | Site city, state |
Regular Season
| Fri., Jan. 13, 1928 no, no | Rutgers | W 42–31 | 1-0 | Arcade Rink; Washington, DC |
| Sat., Jan. 14, 1928 no, no | New York University | L 27-33 | 1-1 | Arcade Rink; Washington, DC |
| Wed., Jan. 18, 1928 no, no | Johns Hopkins | W 36–29 | 2-1 | Arcade Rink; Washington, DC |
| Sat., Jan. 28, 1928 no, no | Mount St. Mary's | W 22–20 | 3-1 | Arcade Rink; Washington, DC |
| Mon., Jan. 30, 1928 no, no | Bucknell | W 34–29 | 4-1 | Arcade Rink; Washington, DC |
| Fri., Feb. 3, 1928 no, no | Roanoke | W 61–21 | 5-1 | Arcade Rink; Washington, DC |
| Mon., Feb. 6, 1928 no, no | Davis & Elkins | cancelled | | Arcade Rink; Washington, DC |
| Fri., Feb. 10, 1928 no, no | Gettysburg | W 40–32 | 6-1 | Arcade Rink; Washington, DC |
| Sat., Feb. 11, 1928 no, no | Lebanon Valley | W 54-29 | 7-1 | Arcade Rink; Washington, DC |
| Tue., Feb. 14, 1928 no, no | at Navy | W 49–40 | 8-1 | Dahlgren Hall; Annapolis, MD |
| Fri., Feb. 17, 1928 no, no | Guilford | W 64–23 | 9-1 | Arcade Rink; Washington, DC |
| Sat., Feb. 18, 1928 no, no | Duke | W 56–40 | 10-1 | Arcade Rink; Washington, DC |
| Wed., Feb. 22, 1928 no, no | at Johns Hopkins | W 41–34 | 11-1 | N/A; Baltimore, MD |
| Tue., Feb. 28, 1928 no, no | Virginia Tech | W 57-33 | 12-1 | Arcade Rink; Washington, DC |
*Non-conference game. (#) Tournament seedings in parentheses.
