= Brotman =

Brotman is a surname. Notable people with the surname include:

- Charlie Brotman (born 1928), American public relations specialist and public address announcer
- Jeffrey Brotman (1942–2017), American lawyer and businessman
- Stanley Brotman (1924–2014), American judge
