= Jonathan S. Morris =

American political scientist

- Education: Miami University (B.A., 1996), Purdue University (M.A., 1998; Ph.D., 2002)
- Scientific career
- Fields: Political science, political communication
- Workplaces: East Carolina University

Jonathan S. Morris is an American political scientist and professor of political science at East Carolina University (ECU), where he is also the director of undergraduate studies in the department of political science. He is known for researching the effects of exposure to news satire television shows, such as the Daily Show and the Colbert Report, on people's political attitudes. For example, a 2006 study he co-authored with his ECU colleague, Jody Baumgartner, examined the effects of viewing the Daily Show's coverage of the 2004 U.S. presidential election on voters' perceptions of George W. Bush and John Kerry among 732 college students. Morris and Baumgartner found that students who watched the Daily Show had more negative opinions of both Bush and Kerry than students who watched CBS clips of election coverage, or who watched nothing at all. The study has since been cited as proof that then-Daily Show host Jon Stewart was undermining democracy, a claim Morris himself disputes. He and Baumgartner have also studied the reported effect of Tina Fey's portrayal of Sarah Palin on SNL on voters' perceptions of Palin herself.
