= 1931–32 Georgetown Hoyas men's basketball team =

American college basketball season

1931–32 Georgetown Hoyas men's basketball
- Conference: Independent
- Record: 6–11
- Head coach: Fred Mesmer (1st season)
- Captain: Dick King
- Home arena: Tech Gymnasium

The 1931–32 Georgetown Hoyas men's basketball team represented Georgetown University during the 1931–32 NCAA college basketball season. Fred Mesmer coached it in his first season as head coach. Georgetown was an independent and played its home games at Tech Gymnasium on the campus of McKinley Technical High School in Washington, D.C. The team finished with a record of 6–11.

Mesmer had played guard on Georgetown's 1927–28, 1928–29, and 1929–30 teams before graduating in 1930. Less than two years after graduation, he was hired at the age of 23 as the Hoyas' head coach. A popular sports figure on campus, he would coach Georgetown for seven seasons, leaving after the end of the 1937–38 season with an overall record of 53–76. Although his teams would go 36–20 (.643) at home, they would manage only a 17–56 (.233) record on the road, and he would have only two winning seasons – 1933–34 and 1936–37 – during his tenure.

This was Georgetown's last season as an independent before beginning a seven-season stint the following year as a member of the Eastern Intercollegiate Conference.

== Roster ==
Georgetown players did not wear numbers on their jerseys this season. The first numbered jerseys in Georgetown men's basketball history would not appear until the 1933–34 season.

Name	Height	Weight (lbs.)	Position	Class	Hometown	Previous Team(s)
Bernard Bonniwell	N/A	N/A	G	Sr.	Philadelphia, PA, U.S.	Northeast Catholic HS
Tom Carolan	N/A	N/A	F	So.	Syracuse, NY, U.S.	Christian Brothers Academy
Bill Connors	N/A	N/A	G	So.	N/A	N/A
Johnny "Jack" Crowley	N/A	N/A	G	So.	N/A	N/A
Bill Gordon	N/A	N/A	G	Sr.	N/A	N/A
Herman Heide	N/A	N/A	G	So.	N/A	N/A
Dick King	N/A	N/A	G	Sr.	New York, NY, U.S.	St. Peter's Preparatory School
Leo McLaughlin	N/A	N/A	G	Sr.	Jersey City, NJ, U.S.	Loyola School (New York, NY)
Vernon Murphy	N/A	N/A	C	Jr.	N/A	N/A
Joe O'Neill	N/A	N/A	C	Sr.	N/A	N/A

== 1931–32 schedule and results ==
It was common practice at this time for colleges and universities to include non-collegiate opponents in their schedules, with the games recognized as part of their official record for the season, and the games played against the Crescent Athletic Club and the Brooklyn Knights of Columbus therefore counted as part of Georgetown's won-loss record for 1931–32. It was not until 1952, after the completion of the 1951–52 season, that the National Collegiate Athletic Association (NCAA) ruled that colleges and universities could no longer count games played against non-collegiate opponents in their annual won-loss records.

Date time, TV	Opponent	Result	Record	Site city, state
Regular Season
Tue., Dec. 15, 1931 no, no	Mount St. Mary's	W 32–23	1-0	Tech Gymnasium; Washington, DC
Fri., Dec. 18, 1931 no, no	Duke	W 36–26	2-0	Tech Gymnasium; Washington, DC
Wed., Jan. 6, 1932 no, no	Baltimore	W 31–23	3-0	Tech Gymnasium; Washington, DC
Fri., Jan. 8, 1932 no, no	at Crescent Athletic Club	L 28–39	3-1	N/A; New York, NY
Sat., Jan. 9, 1932 no, no	at New York University	L 18–26	3-2	University Heights Gymnasium; New York, NY
Mon., Jan. 11, 1932 no, no	St. John's	L 26–27	3-3	Tech Gymnasium; Washington, DC
Wed., Jan. 20, 1932 no, no	at Duquesne	L 27–29	3-4	Duquesne Garden; Pittsburgh, PA
Thu., Jan. 21, 1932 no, no	at Temple	L 19–39	3-5	Mitten Hall; Philadelphia, PA
Sat., Jan. 30, 1932 no, no	at Brooklyn Knights of Columbus	L 27–29	3-6	N/A; New York, NY
Sun., Jan. 31, 1932 no, no	at Army	L 20–24	3-7	Hayes Gymnasium; West Point, NY
Wed., Feb. 3, 1932 no, no	at Loyola Maryland	L 30–31	3-8	Alumni Gymnasium; Baltimore, MD
Fri., Feb. 5, 1932 no, no	Western Maryland	W 25–14	4-8	Tech Gymnasium; Washington, DC
Mon., Feb. 8, 1932 no, no	West Virginia	W 45-31	5-8	Tech Gymnasium; Washington, DC
Sat., Feb. 13, 1932 no, no	Pittsburgh	W 33–30	6-8	Tech Gymnasium; Washington, DC
Fri., Feb. 19, 1932 no, no	at West Virginia	L 28–50	6-9	WVU Field House; Morgantown, WV
N/A no, no	Duquesne	L 24–37	6-10	Tech Gymnasium; Washington, DC
N/A no, no	Carnegie Tech	L 26–36	6-11	Tech Gymnasium; Washington, DC
*Non-conference game. (#) Tournament seedings in parentheses.
