= List of Delta Theta Phi members =

Delta Theta Phi is a professional law fraternity that was established September 26, 1913, by merger of Alpha Kappa Phi, Delta Phi Delta and Theta Lambda Phi. It became an international fraternity when chapters were established in Australia, Canada, Iceland in the late 1960s.

== Judiciary ==
=== U.S. Supreme Court justices ===
- Harry Blackmun – Associate Justice
- Oliver Wendell Holmes Jr. – Associate Justice
- Charles Evans Hughes – Chief Justice
- Alfred Lawrence, 1st Baron Trevethin – Lord Chief Justice of England
- Sandra Day O'Connor – Associate Justice
- John Paul Stevens – Associate Justice
- Edward Douglass White Jr. – Chief Justice

=== Judges ===
- Alfred Lawrence, 1st Baron Trevethin, a Lord Chief Justice of England
- David Gray Ross

== Law ==
- William K. Suter – Clerk of the Supreme Court

== Politics ==
=== Heads of state ===
- Calvin Coolidge (Adams) – President of the United States
- Lyndon B. Johnson (Houston) – President of the United States
- Sir Robert Menzies – Prime Minister of Australia
- Theodore Roosevelt (Sigma Nu Phi – Choate 1903) – President of the United States
- William Howard Taft (Sigma Nu Phi – Taft) – President of the United States

=== United States Cabinet members ===
- Newton D. Baker (Burks) – Secretary of Defense
- Lloyd M. Bentsen (Sam Houston) – Secretary of the Treasury
- Anthony Celebrezze (Day) – Secretary of Health, Education and Welfare
- John Connally (Houston ’38) – Secretary of the Navy, Secretary of the Treasury
- Orville Freeman (Mitchell ’42) – Secretary of Agriculture
- F. David Mathews (Mathews) – Secretary of Health, Education and Welfare
- Francis P. Matthews (Bryan ’48) – Secretary of the Navy
- Frank Pace Jr. (Robinson) – Secretary of the Army
- William P. Rogers (Finch ’37) – Attorney General, Secretary of State

=== U.S. senators ===
- Clinton Presba Anderson
- Frank A. Barrett
- Bob Bartlett
- Lloyd Bentsen
- John W. Bricker
- Dale Bumpers
- John Marshall Butler
- Dennis Chávez
- Bob Dole
- John A. Durkin
- Allen J. Ellender
- Duncan U. Fletcher
- George Gray
- H. John Heinz III
- Eric Kearney
- Robert S. Kerr
- Bob Krueger
- Frank Lausche
- Hall S. Lusk
- Warren Magnuson
- Joseph McCarthy
- John L. McClellan
- Joseph Montoya
- George W. Pepper
- David Pryor
- James A. Reed
- William L. Scott
- John Tower
- Joseph D. Tydings
- David I. Walsh
- Stephen M. Young

=== U.S. House of Representatives ===
- Watkins Moorman Abbitt
- Joseph P. Addabbo
- Beryl Anthony Jr.
- John Ashbrook
- Jack Brooks
- William Dannemeyer
- Eligio de la Garza
- John Dingell
- Lloyd Doggett
- George Mahon
- Carlos Moorhead
- Jim Wright

=== Governors of U.S. states ===
- Lindsay Almond
- Sigurd Anderson
- Edward F. Arn
- James T. Blair Jr.
- Julian Carroll
- John Connally
- George N. Craig
- Mario Cuomo
- Deane C. Davis
- Michael DiSalle
- Orville Freeman
- Richard J. Hughes
- Robert S. Kerr
- Bruce King
- Frank Lausche
- Sidney McMath
- George Nigh
- Albert Ritchie
- Allan Shivers
- Joseph P. Teasdale
