= Bob Nork =

American football and basketball player (1906–1983)

Profile
- Position: Halfback

Personal information
- Born: 1906
- Died: May 11, 1983 (aged 76–77); Shenandoah, Pennsylvania, US

Career information
- College: Georgetown

Robert P. Nork (1906 – May 11, 1983) was an American football and basketball player.

Nork was raised in Shenandoah, Pennsylvania. He attended Georgetown University, where he was a star in both football and basketball. He played halfback for the football team and was selected by Charles E. Parker of the New York Evening Telegram as a third-team halfback on the 1927 All-America team. He played at the forward position for the basketball team. He was the leading scorer on the 1926–27 Georgetown Hoyas men's basketball team and captain of the 1927–28 team that compiled a 12–1 record.

Nork later worked for 40 years as a teacher, football and basketball coach, and athletic director at Shenandoah High School in Shenandoah, Pennsylvania, Garfield High School, Seton Hall Preparatory School, and Pope Pius High School in New Jersey.

Nork died in 1983 at Geisinger Medical Center in Shenandoah. He was posthumously inducted into the Georgetown University Athletic Hall of Fame in 1985.
