= 1917–18 Georgetown Hoyas men's basketball team =

American college basketball season

1917–18 Georgetown Hoyas men's basketball
- Conference: Independent
- Record: 8–6
- Head coach: John O'Reilly (4th season)
- Captain: Bob O'Lone
- Home arena: Ryan Gymnasium

1917–18 NCAA men's basketball independents standings
	Conf.				Overall
Team	W		L	PCT	W		L	PCT
Canisius		–		–	5	–	0	1.000
Creighton		–		–	14	–	0	1.000
Miami (Ohio)		–		–	10	–	0	1.000
Oregon Agricultural		–		–	15	–	0	1.000
Rhode Island State		–		–	3	–	0	1.000
Saint Mary's (Calif.)		–		–	15	–	0	1.000
Santa Clara		–		–	4	–	0	1.000
Stevens Institute		–		–	14	–	0	1.000
Utah State		–		–	9	–	0	1.000
Wisconsin–Stevens Point		–		–	14	–	0	1.000
Syracuse		–		–	16	–	1	.941
Union (N.Y.)		–		–	14	–	1	.933
Idaho		–		–	12	–	1	.923
Louisiana State		–		–	12	–	1	.923
Penn State		–		–	12	–	1	.923
Oklahoma		–		–	11	–	1	.917
Central (Ky.)		–		–	10	–	1	.909
Navy		–		–	14	–	2	.875
Virginia		–		–	7	–	1	.875
Geneva		–		–	13	–	2	.867
Georgia		–		–	6	–	1	.857
Washington & Jefferson		–		–	10	–	2	.833
Kentucky		–		–	9	–	2	.818
North Carolina State		–		–	13	–	3	.813
Springfield (Mass.)		–		–	13	–	3	.813
California		–		–	8	–	2	.800
Bucknell		–		–	11	–	3	.786
Tempe Normal		–		–	14	–	4	.778
Valparaiso		–		–	7	–	2	.778
Fordham		–		–	10	–	3	.769
Kalamazoo		–		–	10	–	3	.769
Boston		–		–	6	–	2	.750
Buffalo		–		–	6	–	2	.750
Franklin		–		–	9	–	3	.750
North Carolina		–		–	9	–	3	.750
North Central		–		–	9	–	3	.750
Tulane		–		–	6	–	2	.750
Virginia Tech		–		–	15	–	5	.750
Stanford		–		–	11	–	4	.733
Marietta		–		–	8	–	3	.727
Niagara		–		–	8	–	3	.727
Detroit		–		–	13	–	5	.722
St. Joseph's		–		–	5	–	2	.714
CCNY		–		–	7	–	3	.700
New Mexico A&M		–		–	7	–	3	.700
Akron		–		–	9	–	4	.692
Carleton		–		–	9	–	4	.692
Central Missouri		–		–	9	–	4	.692
Lafayette		–		–	15	–	7	.682
Army		–		–	8	–	4	.667
Trinity (N.C.)		–		–	10	–	5	.667
Vanderbilt		–		–	6	–	3	.667
Western State Normal		–		–	8	–	4	.667
Wyoming		–		–	4	–	2	.667
Grinnell		–		–	7	–	4	.636
Roanoke		–		–	7	–	4	.636
Brigham Young		–		–	5	–	3	.625
Rutgers		–		–	5	–	3	.625
Seton Hall		–		–	8	–	5	.615
South Carolina		–		–	8	–	5	.615
Southwestern (Kan.)		–		–	8	–	5	.615
Arizona		–		–	3	–	2	.600
Bowling Green State		–		–	6	–	4	.600
Clemson		–		–	3	–	2	.600
North Dakota Agricultural		–		–	9	–	6	.600
Davidson		–		–	7	–	5	.583
Denison		–		–	7	–	5	.583
Millsaps		–		–	7	–	5	.583
Swarthmore		–		–	7	–	5	.583
Georgetown		–		–	8	–	6	.571
SMU		–		–	5	–	4	.556
Utah		–		–	5	–	4	.556
Lehigh		–		–	11	–	9	.550
Mount Union		–		–	7	–	6	.538
Temple		–		–	8	–	7	.533
Wabash		–		–	8	–	7	.533
Duquesne		–		–	4	–	4	.500
Indiana State		–		–	8	–	8	.500
Montana		–		–	6	–	6	.500
Nevada		–		–	3	–	3	.500
St. John's (N.Y.)		–		–	8	–	8	.500
Texas Christian		–		–	4	–	4	.500
VMI		–		–	6	–	6	.500
Millikin		–		–	10	–	11	.476
DePauw		–		–	7	–	8	.467
Catholic		–		–	5	–	6	.455
Delaware		–		–	5	–	6	.455
Washington and Lee		–		–	5	–	6	.455
Bradley		–		–	6	–	8	.429
Colgate		–		–	9	–	12	.429
Louisville		–		–	3	–	4	.429
Manhattan		–		–	6	–	8	.429
Northern Colorado		–		–	3	–	4	.429
Gettysburg		–		–	5	–	7	.417
Auburn		–		–	2	–	3	.400
Beloit		–		–	4	–	6	.400
Marquette		–		–	4	–	6	.400
Michigan State		–		–	6	–	10	.375
Washington State		–		–	7	–	12	.368
Pittsburgh		–		–	5	–	9	.357
William & Mary		–		–	6	–	11	.353
Dayton		–		–	2	–	4	.333
Notre Dame		–		–	2	–	4	.333
Ohio		–		–	4	–	8	.333
Richmond		–		–	3	–	6	.333
Toledo		–		–	2	–	4	.333
Washington		–		–	4	–	8	.333
Wooster		–		–	4	–	9	.308
Alabama		–		–	2	–	5	.286
Oregon		–		–	3	–	8	.273
Cincinnati		–		–	2	–	6	.250
Montana State		–		–	2	–	6	.250
Tennessee		–		–	3	–	9	.250
Wake Forest		–		–	4	–	12	.250
West Virginia		–		–	4	–	13	.235
Fairmount		–		–	3	–	10	.231
Grove City		–		–	2	–	7	.222
Saint Louis		–		–	3	–	12	.200
Washburn		–		–	2	–	9	.182
Tulsa		–		–	1	–	5	.167
Connecticut		–		–	1	–	6	.143
New York University		–		–	1	–	10	.091
Butler		–		–	0	–	6	.000
The Citadel		–		–	0	–	1	.000
Muhlenberg		–		–	0	–	7	.000
Southern California		–		–	0	–	2	.000

The 1917–18 Georgetown Hoyas men's basketball team represented Georgetown University during the 1917–18 NCAA college basketball season. John O'Reilly coached the team in his fourth season as head coach. Georgetown was an independent and played its home games at Ryan Gymnasium on the Georgetown campus in Washington, D.C., and finished the season with a record of 8–6.

== Season recap ==
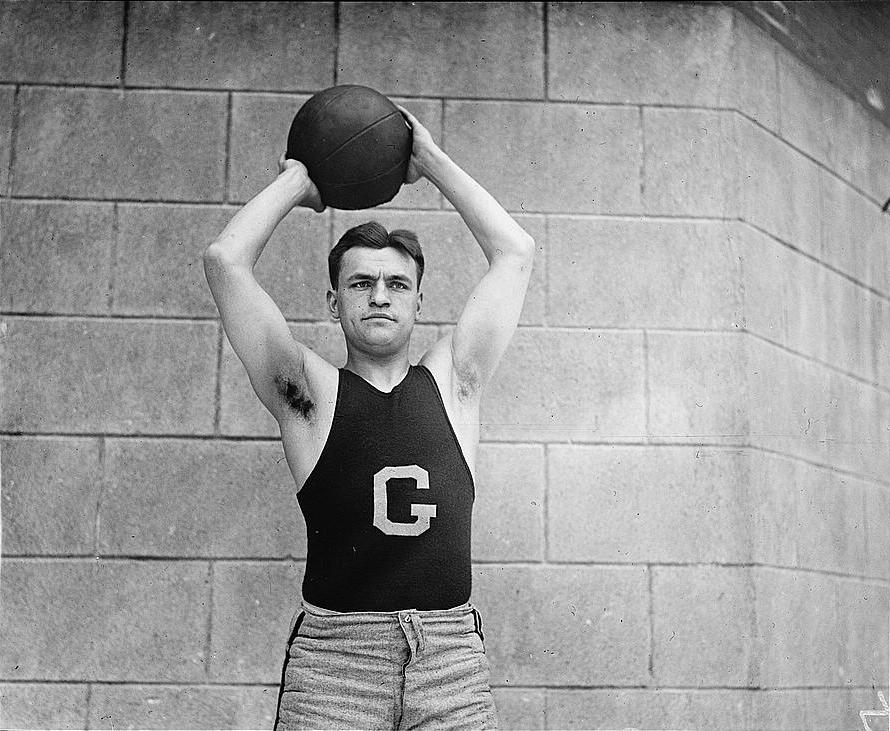
Forward Bill Dudack, seen in 1920, was a freshman in 1917-18. After graduating in 1921, he returned to Georgetown to coach the 1929–30 team.

Although the Hoyas struggled on the road this year, their home winning streak at Ryan Gymnasium reached eight games at the end of the season, dating back to a victory against Bucknell on the last day of the previous season; it would reach 52 before finally coming to an end during the 1923–24 season. Georgetown also defeated crosstown rival George Washington twice this season, giving the Hoyas an eight-game winning streak against George Washington – seven of the wins at Ryan Gymnasium – dating back to 1915.

Forward Fred Fees, a Georgetown University Law School student, was in his second season with the Hoyas. A free-throw shooting specialist in an era when the rules of college basketball allowed teams to choose which player shot its free throws, Fees exploited his free-throw prowess to establish himself as one of the top scorers in college basketball in the United States in each of his seasons with the Hoyas. This season he played in 11 games and scored 201 points, the most by any college player in the country, and his 18.3 points per game set a Georgetown single-season record that would stand until the 1958–59 season. In the game at Navy on January 23, 1918, he scored 15 of the Hoyas's 17 points.

== Roster ==
Georgetown players did not wear numbers on their jerseys this season. The first numbered jerseys in Georgetown men's basketball history would not appear until the 1933–34 season.

Freshman forward Bill Dudack later served as the Hoyas' head coach during the 1929–30 season. Sophomore guard Alexander "Pat" Finnegan left school after the season for United States Army service in World War I and while in military service died of influenza — the so-called "Spanish flu" — during the 1918–1919 influenza pandemic.

Name	Height	Weight (lbs.)	Position	Class	Hometown	Previous Team(s)
James Coughlin	N/A	N/A	G	N/A	N/A	N/A
Hubert Derivaux	N/A	N/A	F	So.	N/A	N/A
Bill Dudack	N/A	N/A	F	Jr.	New Britain, CT, U.S.	New Britain HS
Fred Fees	5'6"	N/A	F	Grad. Stud.	Carrolltown, PA, U.S.	St. Francis College (Pa.)
Alexander "Pat" Finnegan	N/A	N/A	G	So.	N/A	N/A
Don Keresey	N/A	N/A	G	N/A	N/A	N/A
Joseph Longshak	N/A	N/A	G	So.	N/A	N/A
Jack McNulty	N/A	N/A	F	So.	N/A	N/A
Jim McNulty	N/A	N/A	C	Sr.	N/A	N/A
Charles Monaghan	N/A	N/A	F	N/A	N/A	N/A
Bob O'Lone	N/A	N/A	F	Sr.	N/A	N/A

== 1917–18 schedule and results ==
It was common practice at this time for colleges and universities to include non-collegiate opponents in their schedules, with the games recognized as part of their official record for the season, so the games against a United States Army team from Camp Meade, Maryland, a United States Army Amphibious Corps team, and the Georgetown University Medical School counted as part of Georgetown's won-loss record for 1917–18. It was not until 1952, after the completion of the 1951–52 season, that the National Collegiate Athletic Association (NCAA) ruled that colleges and universities could no longer count games played against non-collegiate opponents in their annual won-loss records.

Trinity College of North Carolina was the future Duke University.

Date time, TV	Opponent	Result	Record	Site city, state
Regular Season
Fri., Dec. 7, 1917 no, no	Mount St. Joseph	W 44–10	1-0	Ryan Gymnasium; Washington, DC
Wed., Dec. 12, 1917 no, no	at Loyola Maryland	cancelled		N/A; Baltimore, MD
Wed., Dec. 12, 1917 no, no	Georgetown University Medical	W 46–9	2-0	Ryan Gymnasium; Washington, DC
Sat., Jan. 12, 1918 no, no	at Loyola Maryland	cancelled		N/A; Baltimore, MD
Wed., Jan. 16, 1918 no, no	Lehigh	W 37–26	3-0	Ryan Gymnasium; Washington, DC
Fri., Jan. 18, 1918 no, no	Randolph–Macon	W 34–11	4-0	Ryan Gymnasium; Washington, DC
Wed., Jan. 23, 1918 no, no	at Navy	L 17–49	4-1	Dahlgren Hall; Annapolis, MD
Sat., Jan. 26, 1918 no, no	at George Washington	W 36–8	5-1	YMCA Hall; Washington, DC
Mon., Jan. 28, 1918 no, no	at Mount St. Joseph	L 31–34	5-2	Mount St. Joseph Gymnasium; Baltimore, MD
Fri., Feb. 1, 1918 no, no	George Washington	W 53–18	6-2	Ryan Gymnasium; Washington, DC
Mon., Feb. 4, 1918 no, no	West Virginia Wesleyan	cancelled		Ryan Gymnasium; Washington, DC
Thu., Feb. 7, 1918 no, no	at United States Army Amphibious Corps	L N/A (Note: The Georgetown Basketball History Project: 1910s Records and The Georgetown Basketball History Project: Records vs. Non-Collegiate Opponents Archived 2017-02-12 at the Wayback Machine both list the score of this loss to the United States Army Amphibious Corps as "37-32." The project uses the convention of placing the Georgetown score first for both wins and losses, so this is a typographical error. It is possible that the scores are reversed, and that the Army Amphibious Corps won by a score of 37-32, but that is only one possibility for the actual final score. It is clear that Georgetown lost this game, as this is consistent with the school's final 8-6 record for the season, upon which all sources used for this article agree.)	6-3	N/A; Allentown, PA
Fri., Feb. 8, 1918 no, no	at Lafayette	L 26–36	6-4	N/A; Easton, PA
Sat., Feb. 9, 1918 no, no	at Lehigh	L 26–28	6-5	Taylor Gymnasium; Bethlehem, PA
Sun., Feb. 10, 1918 no, no	at Camp Meade	L 25–33	6-6	Meade Gymnasium; Fort George G. Meade, MD
Tue., Feb. 12, 1918 no, no	Virginia Tech	cancelled		Ryan Gymnasium; Washington, DC
Fri., Feb. 15, 1918 no, no	Trinity (N.C.)	cancelled		Ryan Gymnasium; Washington, DC
Fri., Feb. 15, 1918 no, no	Gallaudet	W 56–25	7-6	Ryan Gymnasium; Washington, DC
Sat., Feb. 23, 1918 no, no	Lafayette	W 43–29	8-6	Ryan Gymnasium; Washington, DC
Tue., Feb. 26, 1918 no, no	Bucknell	cancelled		Ryan Gymnasium; Washington, DC
*Non-conference game. (#) Tournament seedings in parentheses.
