= Charlie Brotman =

American public address announcer

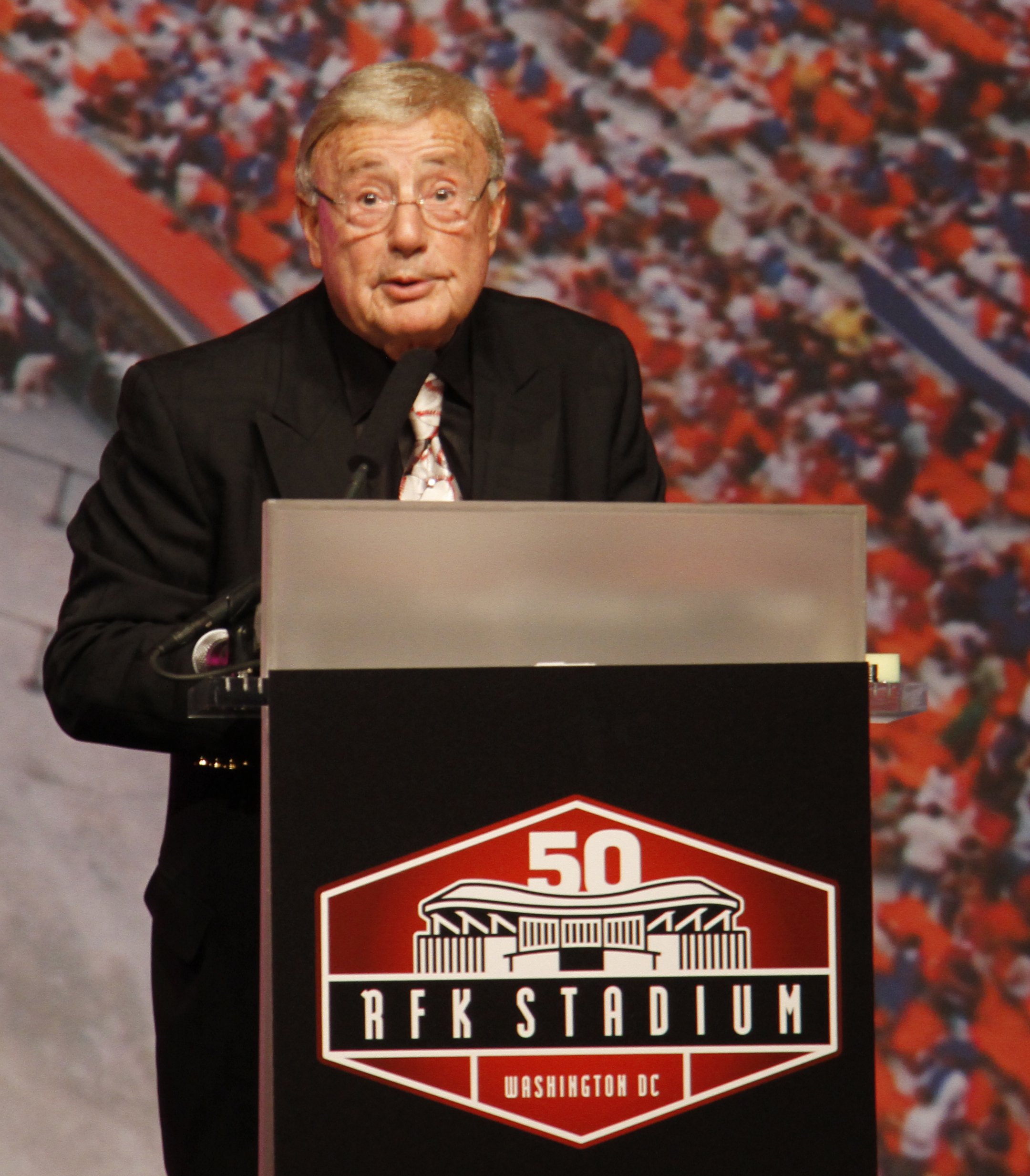
- Born: Charles Julian Brotman; December 30, 1927 (age 98)
- Occupation: Announcer
- Known for: Serving as announcer for US presidential inauguration parades

Charles Julian Brotman (born December 30, 1927) is an American public relations specialist and public address announcer, known for his presentation of U.S. presidential inaugural parades of 12 presidents from Harry S. Truman to Joe Biden (excluding only Donald Trump).

== Early life and career ==
Brotman, the son of Russian-Jewish immigrants, grew up in Northeast Washington, D.C., graduated from McKinley Technology High School and studied at the University of Maryland. He served in the U.S. Navy from 1946 to 1948, then attended the National Academy of Broadcasting.

Following his graduation from the academy, Brotman worked as a disc jockey and sports announcer in Orlando, Florida. A 1956 meeting with Senators' owner Calvin Griffith led to him returning to his hometown of Washington to serve as the announcer at Griffith Stadium for the Washington Senators baseball team. He later became the team's promotions director as well.

In the 1960s, Brotman started his own public relations firm, Brotman|Winter|Fried, specializing in sports promotions. (His firm was acquired by Sage Communications in 2011.) He continued to announce on Opening Day for the Senators each year until the team moved to Texas following the 1971 season. When the Washington Nationals relocated to the city in 2005, Brotman returned to his Opening Day duties.

Brotman joined LINK Strategic Partners, a strategic communications and stakeholder engagement firm based in Washington, DC, as a senior advisor in 2015. He advises the firm on its hyperlocal engagement work in DC and around the country.

Brotman has been inducted into 11 different Halls of Fame during his more than 50 years in public relations and announcing, including the Washington Hall of Fame, the Jewish Sports Hall of Fame, Jock's Hall of Fame, the Public Relations Society of America Hall of Fame, the Advertising Club of Washington Hall of Fame, the Greater Washington Fastpitch Softball Hall of Fame. His most recent induction took place in 2014 at the John F. Kennedy Center for Performing Arts for the Washington Tennis and Education Foundation Hall of Fame.

== As an inauguration announcer ==
In 1949, while a student at the National Academy of Broadcasting, Brotman was recommended by his teacher to serve as an announcer for Harry S. Truman's second inauguration, which was the first presidential inauguration to be televised.

Although he was not involved with Dwight D. Eisenhower's first inauguration, as the announcer for the Washington Senators baseball team, he did introduce Eisenhower when the president threw out the ceremonial first pitch on Griffith Stadium's Opening Day in 1956. Later that year, a White House staffer called Brotman and said Eisenhower was impressed with his work, and he wanted Brotman to introduce him again at the president's second inauguration.

The staffer asked Brotman, "Will you charge a fee? Because our parade budget is very minimal." Brotman responded, "No, as a matter of fact, to be honest, I'd pay you for the honor."

Brotman was behind the microphone for every inaugural parade in Washington, D.C., from Eisenhower's second inauguration in 1957 to Barack Obama's second inauguration in 2013. Obama's second inauguration was the 15th consecutive ceremony that Brotman has announced, and his 16th overall. (The parade for Ronald Reagan's second inauguration was canceled due to the extreme cold weather.)

During the presidency of George W. Bush, Brotman also served as the announcer at tee ball games on the South Lawn of the White House.

President Donald Trump's Presidential Inauguration Committee ended Brotman's streak as announcer, instead picking Steve Ray, a Trump supporter, for the 58th Presidential Inauguration. Brotman was, however, selected to welcome the National Organizers for the Women's March on Washington on January 21, 2017 - the day following the Inauguration.

Brotman was again selected to serve as announcer for Joe Biden's inaugural parade on January 20, 2021.
