= David Gray Ross =

American politician and judge (1935–2013)

David Gray Ross (August 9, 1935 – June 4, 2013) was an American politician, judge, attorney, and academic. He served in the Maryland House of Delegates and was a commissioner in the United States Department of Health and Human Services. He was also a judge with the Prince George's County Circuit Court for fifteen years. Ross taught at American University and University of Central Florida.

== Early life ==
Ross was born on August 9, 1935 in Quanah, Texas. He spent his childhood in Washington, D.C., where he graduated from McKinley Technical High School. He attended George Washington University. He then enrolled in American University, graduating with a B.S. in 1960 and a J.D. in 1964. He belonged to Alpha Phi Omega, Delta Theta Phi, and Omicron Delta Kappa.

Ross served in the United States Army in 1961, continuing in the Army National Guard, retiring as a colonel in the Judge Advocate General's Corps in 1982.

== Career ==
Ross was a member of the District of Columbia Bar, the Maryland State Bar Association, the Prince George's County Bar Association, and the American Bar Association. He was the assistant corporation counsel for the District of Columbia from 1965 to 1967. He was then the Prince George's County. Maryland associate county attorney from 1967 to1968, followed by being the master of juvenile causes in the Prince George's County Circuit Court from 1968 to 1970. He was the assistant dean of men at American University for two years and continued there as a part-time faculty member. Young was a senior partner of the Ross, Lochte, Murray, Redding and Devlin law firm in Bowie, Maryland.

He was elected to the Maryland House of Delegates for Prince George's County as a Democrat from 1971 to 1978. In this capacity, he helped overhaul Maryland's juvenile code. He was an associate judge with the Prince George's County Circuit Court, 7th Judicial Circuit, from 1978 to 1994.

In 1980, President Jimmy Carter appointed Ross to the National Advisory Committee on Juvenile Justice. Ross was a commissioner of the Federal Office of Child Support Enforcement. He also served on the Advisory Board of Juvenile Services and the Governor's Commission on Juvenile Justice.In 1993, President Bill Clinton appointed Ross as the deputy director of the Federal Office of Child Support Enforcement; he managed the office until he retired in 2001.

After retiring, Ross taught in the Department of Criminal Justice at the University of Central Florida from 2001 until 2011. Ross served on President Barack Obama's Department of Health and Human Services' transition team in 2008.

== Honors ==
Ross received the Meritorious Service Medal for his time in the armed services He was selected as the National Family Court Judge of the Year in 1989. Ross was given a lifetime achievement award from the United States Department of Health and Human Services in 2000

== Personal life ==
Ross was married to Jane Noel Lewis of Scranton, Pennsylvania. They had two children: Abigail and Justine. His marriage ended in divorce.

Ross was chair of the board of trustees of Prince George's Community College from 1969 to 1970 and served on the board of directors of the Children's RIghts Council and American University. He was president of the board of trustees of the Hyattsville's Meals on Wheels, the Alpha Phi Omega Alumni Association, and the Baltimore Annual Conference of United Methodist Church. He was a member of the First United Methodist Church in Hyattsville, Maryland.

After he retired, Ross lived in Bowie, Maryland, and Orlando, Florida. He moved to the Woodward Estates assisted living facility in Bowie, Maryland, in 2011. Ross died of congestive heart failure on June 4, 2013, at Woodward Estates at the age of 77.
