= Elmer Ripley =

Basketball player and coach (1891–1982)

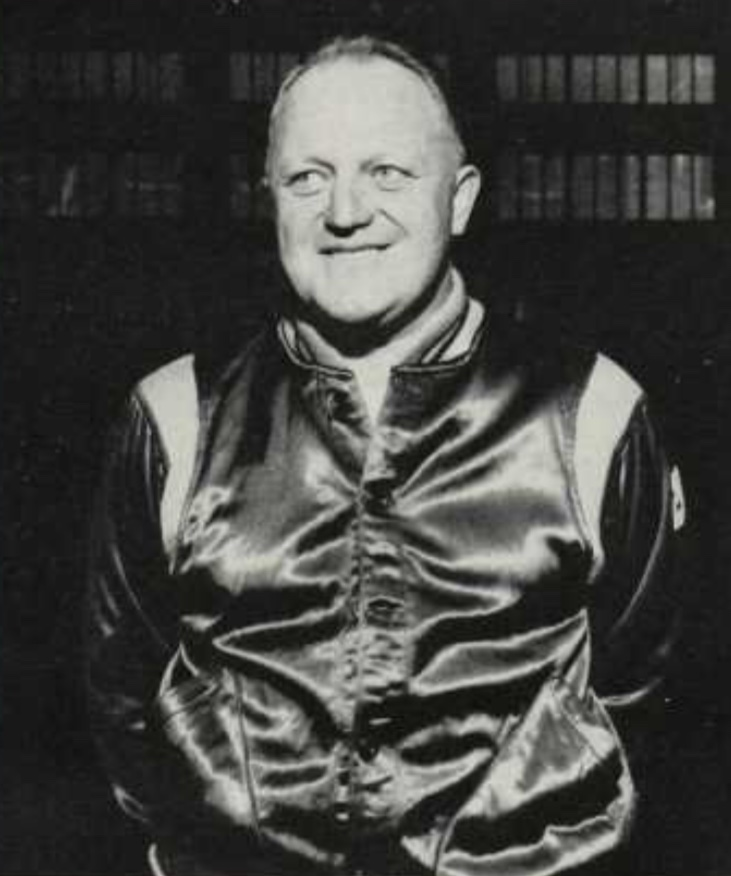
- Ripley from the 1943 Domesday Booke

Biographical details
- Born: July 21, 1892; Staten Island, New York, U.S.
- Died: April 29, 1982 (aged 90); New York City, New York, U.S.

Coaching career (HC unless noted)
- 1922–1925: Wagner
- 1927–1929: Georgetown
- 1929–1935: Yale
- 1938–1943: Georgetown
- 1943–1945: Columbia
- 1945–1946: Notre Dame
- 1946–1949: Georgetown
- 1949–1951: John Carroll
- 1951–1953: Army

Head coaching record
- Overall: 301–226 (college)
- Basketball Hall of Fame; Inducted in 1973 (profile)

Elmer H. Ripley (July 21, 1891 – April 29, 1982) was an American basketball coach. He coached college basketball at seven different schools and for several professional teams.

== Early life ==
Ripley was born in Staten Island, New York on July 21, 1891. After graduating from local Curtis High School, he attended Brown University.

== Playing career ==
Ripley began his career as a player before making the switch to coach in 1922. At age 19, Ripley decided to leave Brown to play basketball professionally with the Interstate Basketball League's Brooklyn Trolley Dodgers, the New York League's Utica Utes, and the "Original Celtics" club. Ripley would enjoy numerous achievements including being voted among the ten best pro players from 1909 to 1926.

== Coaching career ==
After playing, he went on to coach basketball at several major American universities and traveled the world teaching the game. Ripley began his first professional coaching tenure with Wagner College in 1922, before moving into a position at Georgetown University in 1927. He won 12 of his first 13 games. During his many years with the Georgetown, he achieved a 133–82 record and lead the Hoyas to the NCAA tournament in 1943, reaching the national championship game. Ripley was hired away by several colleges including Columbia University, University of Notre Dame, and Yale University, which he coached to the 1933 Ivy League championship.

After leaving Georgetown in 1949, Ripley coached the Harlem Globetrotters (1953–1956), the Israeli Olympic team (1956) and the Canadian Olympic team (1960). The U.S. Committee for Sports sent Ripley to Israel in 1957 to teach basketball. In 1962, Ripley coached high school basketball for the Englewood (N.J.)School for Boys (later part of the Dwight-Englewood School). In 1965–66, while coaching at Englewood, Ripley was hired by the New York Knicks to teach their center, future Hall of Famer Willis Reed, how to play the power forward position when the Knicks acquired a second center, future Hall of Famer Walt Bellamy, for their team. Ripley continued to coach through his 80th birthday and was inducted into the Naismith Memorial Basketball Hall of Fame in 1973.

Ripley died on April 29, 1982, at the age of 90.

== Head coaching record ==
=== College ===
Record table
Season	Team	Overall	Conference	Standing	Postseason
Wagner Seahawks (Independent) (1922–1925)
1922–23	Wagner	6–6			
1923–24	Wagner	8–8			
1924–25	Wagner	9–8			
Wagner:		23–22 (.511)			
Georgetown Hoyas (Independent) (1927–1929)
1927–28	Georgetown	12–1			
1928–29	Georgetown	12–5			
Georgetown:		24–6 (.800)			
Yale Bulldogs (Eastern Intercollegiate Basketball League) (1929–1935)
1929–30	Yale	13–8	4–6	T–3rd	
1930–31	Yale	15–8	6–4	T–2nd	
1931–32	Yale	10–12	1–9	6th	
1932–33	Yale	19–3	8–2	1st	
1933–34	Yale	14–9	7–5	T–3rd	
1934–35	Yale	11–10	5–7	4th	
Yale:		82–50 (.621)	31–33 (.484)		
Georgetown Hoyas (Eastern Intercollegiate Conference) (1938–1939)
1938–39	Georgetown	13–9	6–4	T–1st	
Georgetown Hoyas (Independent) (1939–1943)
1939–40	Georgetown	8–10			
1940–41	Georgetown	16–4			
1941–42	Georgetown	9–11			
1942–43	Georgetown	22–5			NCAA Runner-up
Georgetown:		68–39 (.381)	6–4 (.600)		
Columbia Lions (Eastern Intercollegiate Basketball League) (1943–1945)
1943–44	Columbia	7–9	2–6	T–3rd	
1944–45	Columbia	9–10	1–5	4th	
Columbia:		16–19 (.457)	3–11 (.214)		
Notre Dame Fighting Irish (Independent) (1945–1946)
1945–46	Notre Dame	17–4			
Notre Dame:		17–4 (.810)			
Georgetown Hoyas (Independent) (1946–1949)
1946–47	Georgetown	17–4			
1947–48	Georgetown	13–15			
1948–49	Georgetown	9–15			
Georgetown:		39–34 (.534)			
John Carroll Blue Streaks (Independent) (1949–1951)
1949–50	John Carroll	9–11			
1950–51	John Carroll	2–21			
John Carroll:		11–32 (.256)			
Army Cadets (Independent) (1951–1953)
1951–52	Army	8–9			
1952–53	Army	11–8			
Army:		19–17 (.528)			
Total:		301–226 (.571)			
National champion Postseason invitational champion Conference regular season champion Conference regular season and conference tournament champion Division regular season champion Division regular season and conference tournament champion Conference tournament champion

== See also ==
- List of NCAA Division I Men's Final Four appearances by coach
