= Al Lujack =

American basketball player (1920–2002)

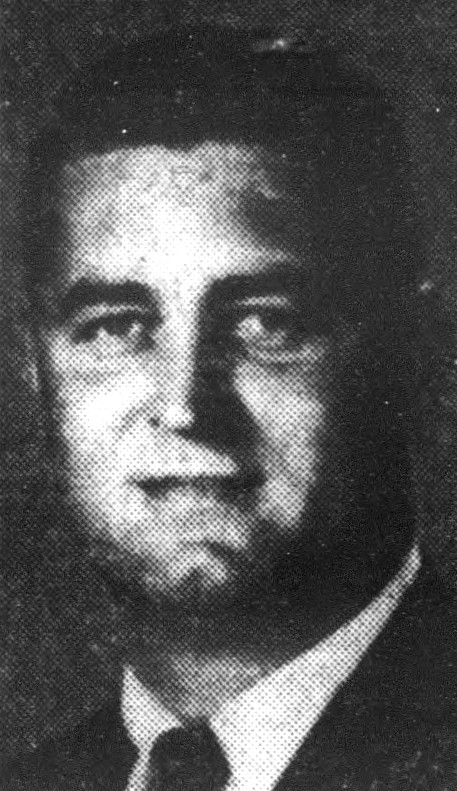
- Lujack, circa 1961

Personal information
- Born: October 5, 1920
- Died: December 26, 2002 (aged 82) Bethesda, Maryland
- Listed height: 6 ft 3 in (1.91 m)
- Listed weight: 220 lb (100 kg)

Career information
- High school: Connellsville (Connellsville, Pennsylvania)
- College: Georgetown (1939–1940, 1941–1942)
- Position: Forward
- Number: 22

Career history
- 1946: Washington Capitols
- Stats at NBA.com
- Stats at Basketball Reference

Aloysius Richard Lujack (October 5, 1920 – December 26, 2002) was an American professional basketball player. He spent one season in the Basketball Association of America (BAA) as a member of the Washington Capitols. He attended Georgetown University, where he played on the football, basketball, and track and field teams.

Al's younger brother, Johnny Lujack, won the Heisman Trophy in 1947 while playing football for Notre Dame.

== BAA career statistics ==
Legend
GP	Games played
FG%	Field-goal percentage
FT%	Free-throw percentage
APG	Assists per game
PPG	Points per game

=== Regular season ===
Year	Team	GP	FG%	FT%	APG	PPG
1946–47	Washington	5	.125	.400	.0	.8
Career		5	.125	.400	.0	.8
