= 1919–20 Georgetown Hoyas men's basketball team =

American college basketball season

1919–20 Georgetown Hoyas men's basketball
- Conference: Independent
- Record: 13–1
- Head coach: John O'Reilly (6th season)
- Captain: Bill Dudack
- Home arena: Ryan Gymnasium

The 1919–20 Georgetown Hoyas men's basketball team represented Georgetown University during the 1919–20 NCAA college basketball season. John O'Reilly coached the team in his sixth season as head coach. Georgetown was an independent and played its home games at Ryan Gymnasium on the Georgetown campus in Washington, D.C., and finished the season with a record of 13–1.

== Season recap ==
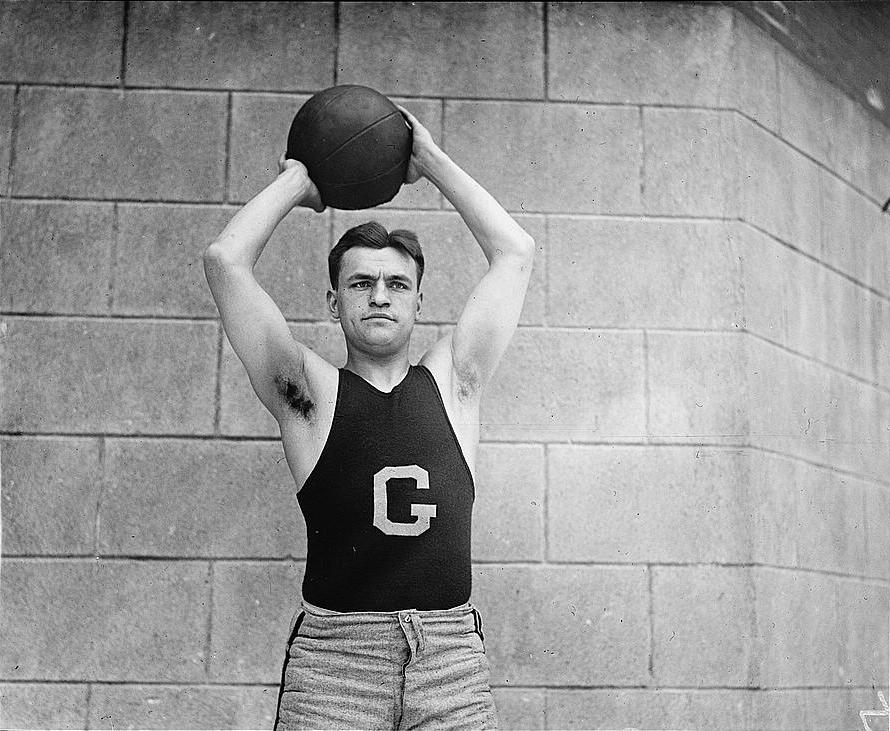
Junior forward Bill Dudack, seen in 1920, was the team captain in 1919-20 and lettered for the team. After graduating in 1921, he returned to Georgetown to coach the 1929–30 team.

On-campus Ryan Gymnasium, where the Hoyas had played their home games since the 1914–15 season, had no seating, accommodating fans on a standing-room only-basis on an indoor track above the court. This precluded the accommodation of significant crowds, providing the self-sustaining Basketball Association with little revenue with which to fund the team's travel expenses and averaged no more than three road games a year from the 1918–19 season through the 1926–27 season in order to keep travel to a minimum. The 1919–20 team's only road trip outside of Washington was to New York City and Connecticut at the end of the season.

The 1918–1919 season had taken place between the second and third waves of the 1918–1919 influenza pandemic—the so-called "Spanish flu"—and had been shortened to only 10 games. That team had finished with a record of 9–1, and because of the pandemic its players were granted an extra year of college eligibility. As a result, all five starters from the 1918–1919 team returned for the 1919–1920 season, setting the stage for even greater success during the year.

The Hoyas' home winning streak at Ryan Gymnasium reached 25 games at the end of this season, dating back to a victory against Bucknell on the last day of the 1916–17 season; it would reach 52 before finally coming to an end during the 1923–24 season. A highlight of the home season at Ryan was the Hoyas' upset of North Carolina, considered one of the top teams in the United States at the time. Georgetown also defeated crosstown rival George Washington twice again this season, giving the Hoyas a 12-game winning streak against George Washington—ten of the wins at Ryan Gymnasium—dating back to 1915.

Georgetown University Law School student Fred Fees, a forward, completed his college basketball career this season. A free-throw shooting specialist in an era when the rules of college basketball allowed teams to choose which player shot its free throws, Fees had exploited his free-throw prowess to establish himself as one of the top scorers in college basketball in the United States in each of his four seasons with the Hoyas. This season he averaged 17.7 points per game and scored a total of 245 points, a career high and half of all the points the team scored. He made 61 field goals this season and shot 123-for-140 (87.9%) from the free-throw line, a free-throw-shooting percentage that remained a school record until 1978. Fees completed his collegiate career with a career average of 16.8 points scored per game, a remarkable record, and had no peer in college basketball of the era; through at least the 2012–13 season it remains the fourth-highest career average in Georgetown men's basketball history. He scored 804 points in the 48 collegiate games he played for Georgetown and led the team in scoring in 45 of them. During his four years with the Hoyas he scored 45 percent of their points.

Sophomore forward Jack Flavin became a starter this year and, in fact, started all 14 games. An excellent shooter, he averaged 4.7 points per game and scored a total of 66 points.

Sophomore guard Andrew "Andy" Zazzali played in all 14 games and continued the strong scoring he had displayed the previous season. He averaged 7.0 points per game and scored a total of 98 points.

The team opened the season with an 11-game winning streak, finally losing at Yale. It then closed the season with two wins to finish at 13-1. It tied the 1910–11 team for what was then the largest number of wins in school history, and its .929 winning percentage remains the best in Georgetown men's basketball history. In 1995, the Premo-Porretta Power Poll retroactively ranked the team sixth in the United States for the 1919–20 season.

== Roster ==
Georgetown players did not wear numbers on their jerseys this season. The first numbered jerseys in Georgetown men's basketball history would not appear until the 1933–34 season.

Junior forward and team captain Bill Dudack later served as the Hoyas' head coach during the 1929–30 season.

Name	Height	Weight (lbs.)	Position	Class	Hometown	Previous Team(s)
Bill Dudack	N/A	N/A	F	Jr.	New Britain, CT, U.S.	New Britain HS
Fred Fees	5'6"	N/A	F	Grad. Stud.	Carrolltown, PA, U.S.	St. Francis College (Pa.)
Jack Flavin	5'11"	175	F	Jr.	Portland, ME, U.S.	Portland HS
Thomas Hart	N/A	N/A	F	Sr.	N/A	N/A
Joseph Longshak	N/A	N/A	G	Sr.	N/A	N/A
Joe O'Connell	N/A	N/A	C	So.	N/A	N/A
Harry "Zube" Sullivan	N/A	N/A	C	Jr.	Fall River, MA, U.S.	B. M. C. Durfee HS
Andy Zazzali	N/A	N/A	G	So.	Baltimore, MD, U.S.	Mount St. Joseph HS

== 1919–20 schedule and results ==
Note (Note: Sources all agree that Georgetown's record for the season was 13–1, but the schedule posted by The Georgetown Basketball History Project – which also states that the overall record was 13–1 – shows only 13 games played, consisting of 12 wins and 1 loss. The 2012-2013 Georgetown Men's Basketball Media Guide, p. 61, lists 14 games – 13 wins and 1 loss. The extra game listed by the media guide is an undated 47-19 victory against George Washington listed as the first game of the 1919-20 season. For the preceding 1918-19 season, The Georgetown Basketball History Project and other sources agree that Georgetown finished with a 9-1 record, but the Project lists 11 games (10 wins and 1 loss) played. It lists an undated 47-19 win over George Washington as the last game of the 1918-19 season as one of three games between Georgetown and George Washington that season, but the media guide lists only two George Washington games that season, both earlier in the year. the two schools apparently played two games against each other each season in this era, so three games in 1918-19 and only one in 1919-20 as listed by The Georgetown Basketball History Project seems less likely than two each season as listed in the media guide. It appears that the Georgetown Basketball History Project is mistaken in showing the 47-19 win over George Washington as the last game of the 1918-19 season when it actually as the first game of the 1919-20 season.)

It was common practice at this time for colleges and universities to include non-collegiate opponents in their schedules, with the games recognized as part of their official record for the season, so the game against a United States Army team from Camp Humphrey, Virginia, counted as part of Georgetown's won-loss record for 1919–20. It was not until 1952, after the completion of the 1951–52 season, that the National Collegiate Athletic Association (NCAA) ruled that colleges and universities could no longer count games played against non-collegiate opponents in their annual won-loss records.

Date time, TV	Opponent	Result	Record	Site city, state
Regular Season
N/A no, no	George Washington	W 47–19	1-0	Ryan Gymnasium; Washington, DC
Wed., Jan. 14, 1920 no, no	St. John's (Md.)	W 40–4	2-0	Ryan Gymnasium; Washington, DC
N/A no, no	Camp Humphrey	W 39–21	3-0	Ryan Gymnasium; Washington, DC
Tue., Jan. 20, 1920 no, no	Delaware	W 40–27	4-0	Ryan Gymnasium; Washington, DC
Sat., Jan. 31, 1920 no, no	at George Washington	W 34–18	5-0	YMCA Hall; Washington, DC
N/A no, no	West Virginia Wesleyan	W 36–18	6-0	Ryan Gymnasium; Washington, DC
N/A no, no	Johns Hopkins	W 36–21	7-0	Ryan Gymnasium; Washington, DC
N/A no, no	North Carolina	W 36–27	8-0	Ryan Gymnasium; Washington, DC
N/A no, no	Davis & Elkins	W 38–22	9-0	Ryan Gymnasium; Washington, DC
Fri., Feb. 20, 1920 no, no	St. John's (NY)	W 41–23	10-0	Ryan Gymnasium; Washington, DC
Mon., Feb. 23, 1920 no, no	at New York Agricultural	W 31–18	11-0	N/A; New York, NY
Tue., Feb. 24, 1920 no, no	at Yale	L 17–46	11-1	Yale Armory; New Haven, CT
Thu., Feb. 26, 1920 no, no	at Fordham	W 46–31	12-1	N/A; New York, NY
Fri., Feb. 27, 1920 no, no	at St. John's (NY)	W 50–25	13-1	N/A; New York, NY
*Non-conference game. (#) Tournament seedings in parentheses.
