= Jody C. Baumgartner =

American political scientist

Jody C Baumgartner (born July 24, 1958) is an American Thomas Harriot College of Arts and Sciences distinguished professor in the Department of Political Science at East Carolina University. Raised in Syracuse, New York, he received his bachelor's degree from the University of Maine at Farmington, and his master's degree and PhD in political science from Miami University in 1998, specializing in the study of political humor and the vice presidency.

== Books and publications ==
- 2000. Modern Presidential Electioneering: An Organizational and Comparative Approach. Westport, CT: Praeger. Baumgartner has also published over 70 articles, chapters, and reviews on political humor, the vice presidency, and campaigns and elections
- 2003. Checking Executive Power: Presidential Impeachment in Comparative Perspective. Westport, CT: Praeger (edited with Naoko Kada).
- 2006. The American Vice Presidency Reconsidered. Westport, CT: Praeger.
- 2008. Laughing Matters: Humor and American Politics in the Media Age. New York: Routledge (edited with Jonathan S. Morris).
- 2014. Politics Is a Joke!: How TV Comedians Are Remaking Political Life. Boulder, CO: Westview (with S. Robert Lichter and Jonathan Morris).
- 2015. The Vice Presidency: From the Shadow to the Spotlight. Lanham, MD: Rowman & Littlefield.
- 2017. The Internet and the 2016 Presidential Campaign, Lexington (with Terri Towner, eds.).
- 2018. Political Humor in a Changing Media Landscape: A New Generation of Research. Lexington (with Amy B. Becker, eds.).
- 2019. American Political Humor: Masters of Satire and Their Impact on U.S. Policy and Culture (2 Volume Encyclopedia). ABC-CLIO (11 substantive chapters contributed).
- 2019. Conventional Wisdom and American Elections: Exploding Myths, Exploring Misconceptions. Fourth Edition. Lanham, MD: Rowman & Littlefield (with Peter L. Francia).
- 2022. The Internet and the 2020 Presidential Campaign, Lexington (with Terri Towner, eds.).
- 2023. Political Marketing and the Election of 2020, Routledge (with Bruce Newman, eds.)
- 2024. Modern Political Caricatures: "I Can See Russia from My House (Palgrave MacMillan).
