= Christian Brothers Academy (DeWitt, New York) =

Private school in New York, United States

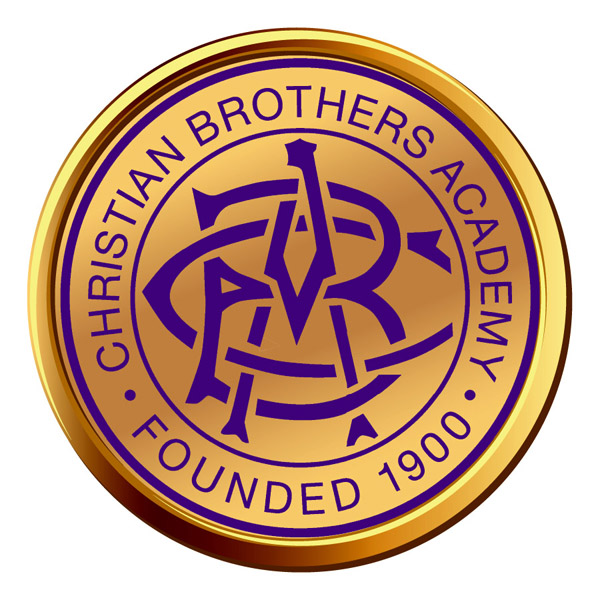

Location
- 6245 Randall Road; Dewitt, (Onondaga County), New York 13214; United States; 43°1′55″N 76°5′17″W

Information
- Type: Private, Coeducational
- Religious affiliation: Lasallian Catholic School
- Established: 1903; 123 years ago
- President: Matthew Keough
- Principal: David Marshall '02
- Grades: 7-12
- Enrollment: 732 (2022-2023)
  - Grade 7: 111
  - Grade 8: 112
  - Grade 9: 123
  - Grade 10: 138
  - Grade 11: 118
  - Grade 12: 130
- Colors: Purple and Gold
- Nickname: Brothers
- Accreditation: Middle States Association of Colleges and Schools
- Tuition: $11,885 + $295 activity fee (9–12) $11,500 + $295 activity fee (7–8)
- Website: www.cbasyracuse.org

Christian Brothers Academy (CBA) is a private Catholic college preparatory school in suburban Syracuse, New York run by the Brothers of the Christian Schools, founded by St. John Baptist de La Salle. Located within the Roman Catholic Diocese of Syracuse, the school has more than 750 students in grades seven through twelve. It was founded in 1900 by the Christian Brothers, who still run the school, though most of the teachers are laity. In 1960, it moved from its original site on Willow Street in downtown Syracuse to its current location in suburban Dewitt on Randall Road. CBA was a boys-only school until September 1987. CBA opened to girls after Syracuse's all-girls school, The Franciscan Academy, closed and many of those parents actively lobbied to have CBA accept female students.

In 2019, CBA was named a National Blue Ribbon School of Excellence, one of 50 private schools nationally, and the only private school in New York State. CBA was also ranked as the No. 1 Catholic high school in all of Upstate New York by NYup.com.

Niche.com ranks CBA as the #1 best Catholic High School in the Syracuse area.

In the past 25 years, the school has captured state championships in baseball, boys basketball, football (3 titles), girls lacrosse (4 titles), boys lacrosse, boys soccer, ice hockey and cross country. In addition, individuals have won state titles in track and swimming.

== Notable alumni ==
Notable alumni include:

- Carl Edward Baum, electrical engineer and academician at University of New Mexico
- Jody C. Baumgartner, THCAS Distinguished Professor at East Carolina University
- Earl Belcher, basketball player, St. Bonaventure, NBA San Antonio Spurs
- Robert Congel, American real estate developer
- Sen. John DeFrancisco
- SirVocea Dennis, NFL player
- Riley Dixon, NFL player
- Marty Domres, NFL player
- Pat Murphy, Major League Baseball manager, 2026 World Series champion
- Frank Riccelli, Major League Baseball pitcher
- John Robert Greene, historian and author
- Fr. Borys Gudziak, director of Ukrainian Catholic University
- Billy Owens, football player, University of Pittsburgh, NFL Dallas Cowboys
- Walt Patulski, University of Notre Dame and NFL football player, top pick of 1972 NFL draft
- Greg Paulus, Head basketball coach Niagara University men's basketball, Duke University basketball player and Syracuse University football player
- Joe Papaleo, Syracuse University, All Pro Soccer player, 1993, 1994
- Nicholas J. Pirro, former Onondaga County executive
- Mark Reed, physicist
- Kathryn Smith, first full-time female National Football League coach
- James T. Walsh, former Congressman
- Jack Sepkoski, University of Chicago paleontologist.
