= New York Athletic Club men's basketball team =

New York Athletic Club basketball
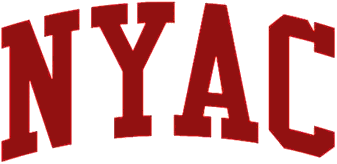
- Leagues: NACAD
- Founded: 1952; 74 years ago
- Arena: New York Athletic Club (capacity: 1,000)
- Location: New York City, United States
- Team colors
- President: Domninic Bruzzese
- Head coach: Ross Burns
- Championships: NACAD Championships (5)
- Website: nyac.org/basketball
Home	Away

New York Athletic Club Men's Basketball Team is an independent basketball club representing the basketball department of The New York Athletic Club. Founded in 1952, the teams most recent accomplishment is winning back-to-back NACAD Championships, a tournament held for basketball teams part of large sporting clubs around the United States.

== Club roster ==
- John Baumann (Columbia)
- Nate Brown (St. Peters '02)
- Pawel Buczak (Princeton)
- Zahir Carrington (Lehigh)
- Colin Cunningham (Holy Cross '09)
- Keenan Jeppesen (Brown '08)
- Nate Lubick (Georgetown '14)
- Mark MacDonald (Brown '08)
- Matt Minoff (Yale '04)
- Paul Vitelli (Yale '04)
- Basketball Chairman/Coach - Ross Burns (UMass '99)
- Asst. Coach - Tim Burns (George Mason '07)
