= Crescent Athletic Club =

Athletic club in New York (1884–1939)

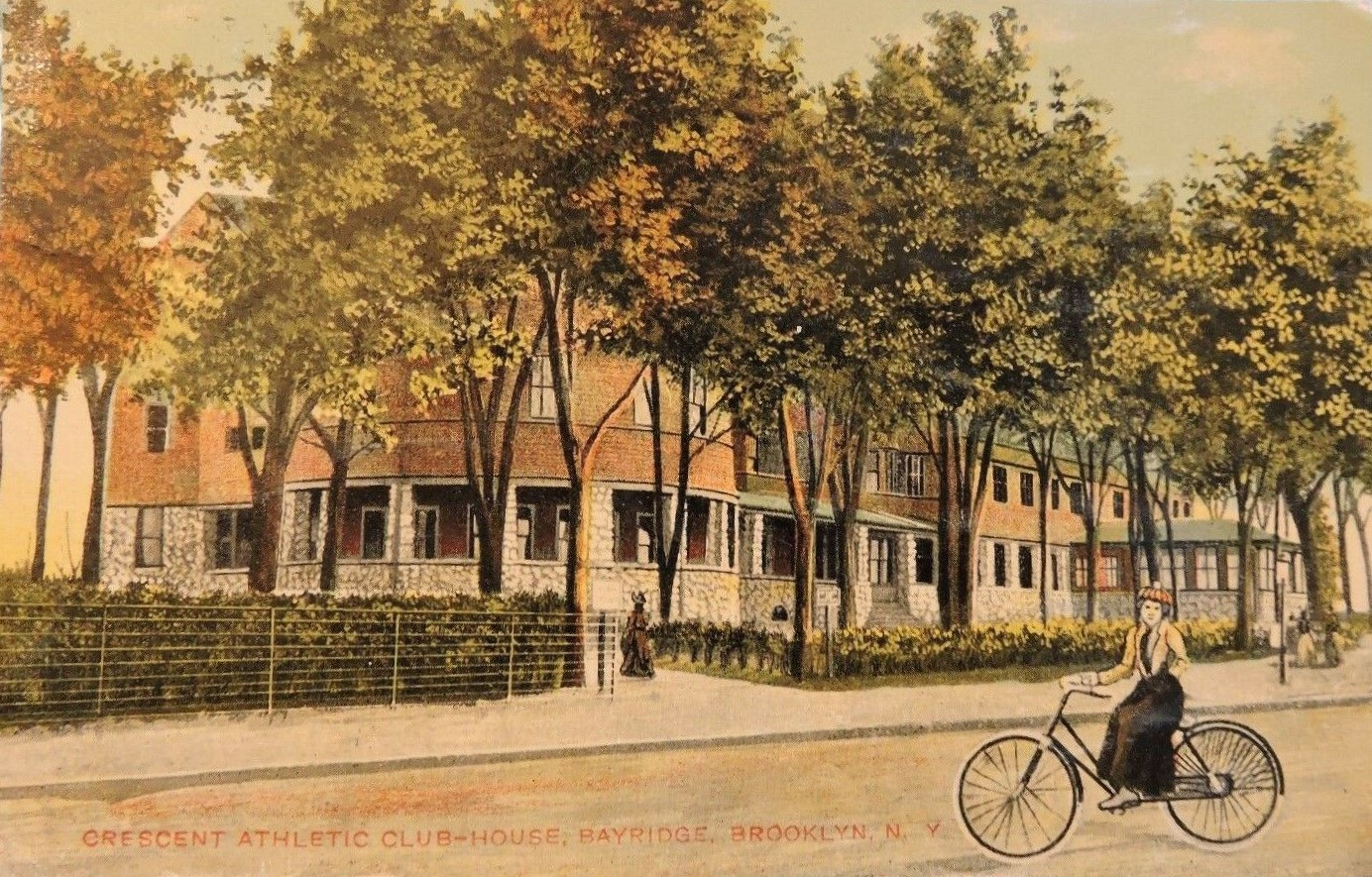
Circa 1909 postcard of Crescent Athletic Club, Bay Ridge, Brooklyn

The Crescent Athletic Club was an athletic club in Brooklyn. Founded by a group of Yale University alumni in 1884 as an American football club, it later expanded to include other sports, including baseball, lacrosse, ice hockey and basketball. The club had over 1,500 members in the early 20th century. The club's membership declined in the 20th century, and it filed for bankruptcy in 1939. The club also became an important social institution in the Bay Ridge section of Brooklyn, hosting plays, dinners, dances, lectures, concerts, and minstrel shows.

The club fielded a football team (known as the Brooklyn Crescents) that competed with the major collegiate and non-collegiate football teams in the late 19th century, including Princeton, Yale, Penn, and the Orange Athletic Club. The team won American Football Union championships five consecutive years from 1888 to 1892. The Crescents played their football games at various locations including Washington Park and Eastern Park. The club also fielded a strong baseball club, also known as the Crescents.

The club had an ice hockey team, the Brooklyn Crescents, in the American Amateur Hockey League in 1896–97 and between 1899 and 1917.

The Crescent Athletic Club House, completed in Brooklyn Heights in 1906, is now known as The Bosworth Building of Saint Ann's School. The club's papers reside with the Brooklyn Historical Society.
