= McKinley Technology High School =

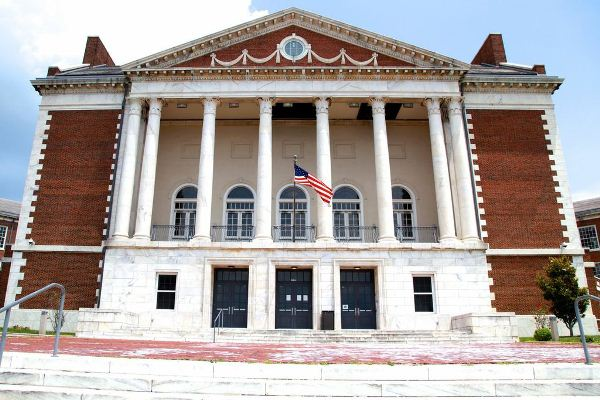
- Front monumental facade of McKinley Technology High School

Location
- 151 T Street Northeast; Washington D.C. 20002; United States; 38°54′55″N 77°0′17″W

Information
- School type: Public high school
- Motto: "No excuses, just solutions"
- Established: 1902, 2004
- Closed: 1997 (reopened 2004)
- School district: District of Columbia Public Schools Ward 5
- CEEB code: 090044
- Principal: Kortni Stafford
- Faculty: 50.3 (on an FTE basis)
- Grades: 9-12
- Enrollment: 723 (2025-26)
- Student to teacher ratio: 14.4
- Campus type: Urban
- Colors: Maroon and grey
- Mascot: Firebird
- Nickname: Trainers
- Website: www.mckinleytech.org

McKinley Technology High School is a public citywide 9th–12th grade high school in Washington, D.C.. The school is named for William McKinley, the 25th president of the United States.

Situated in the Eckington neighborhood of Northeast DC overlooking the core of Washington, McKinley Tech is the main technical high school for the District of Columbia Public School system. Originally an offshoot of Central High School (now Cardozo Senior High School), it was first called McKinley Technical High School and moved to its current campus in 1928.

== History ==
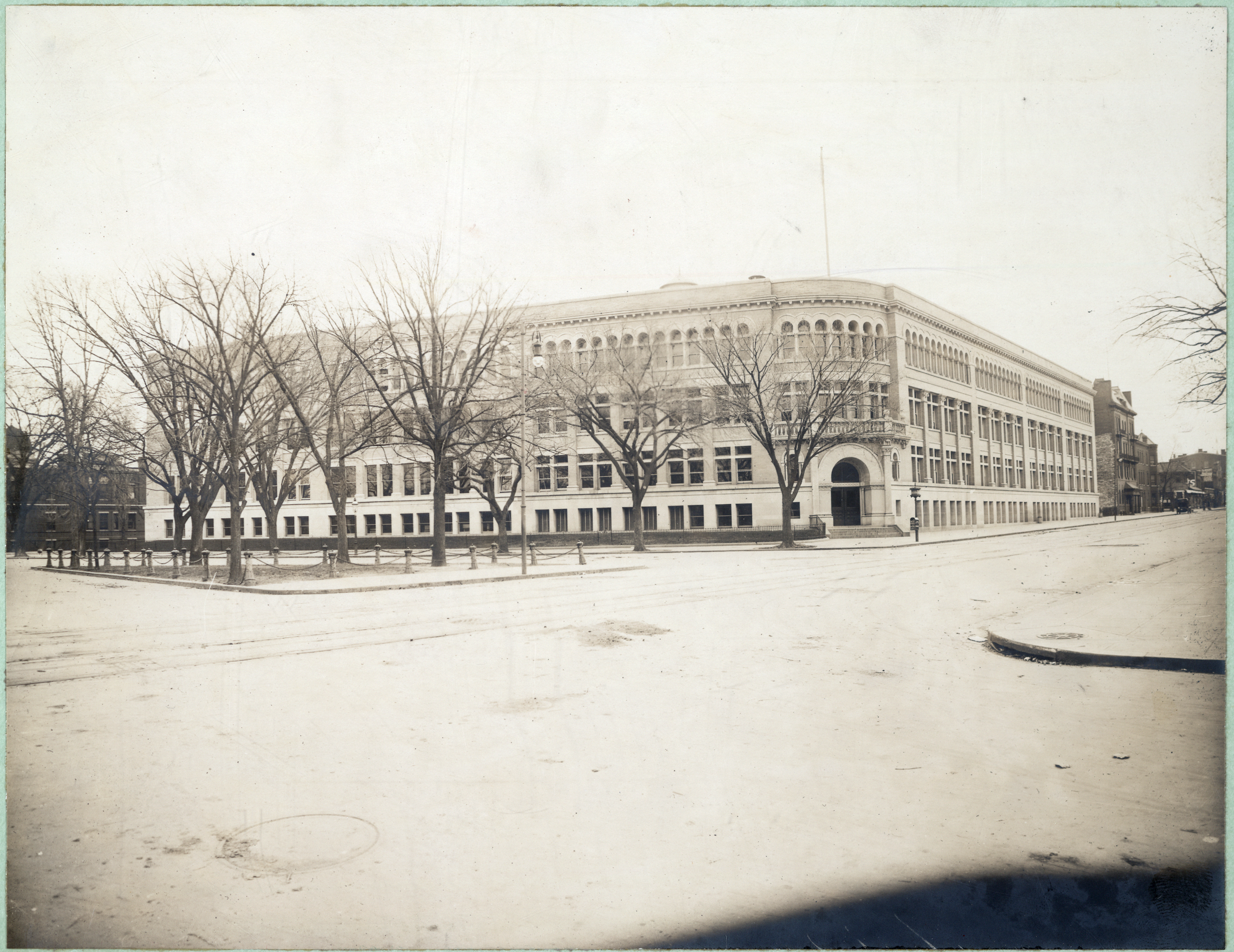
1911 photo of McKinley Tech's first building, located at 7th St and New York Ave NE

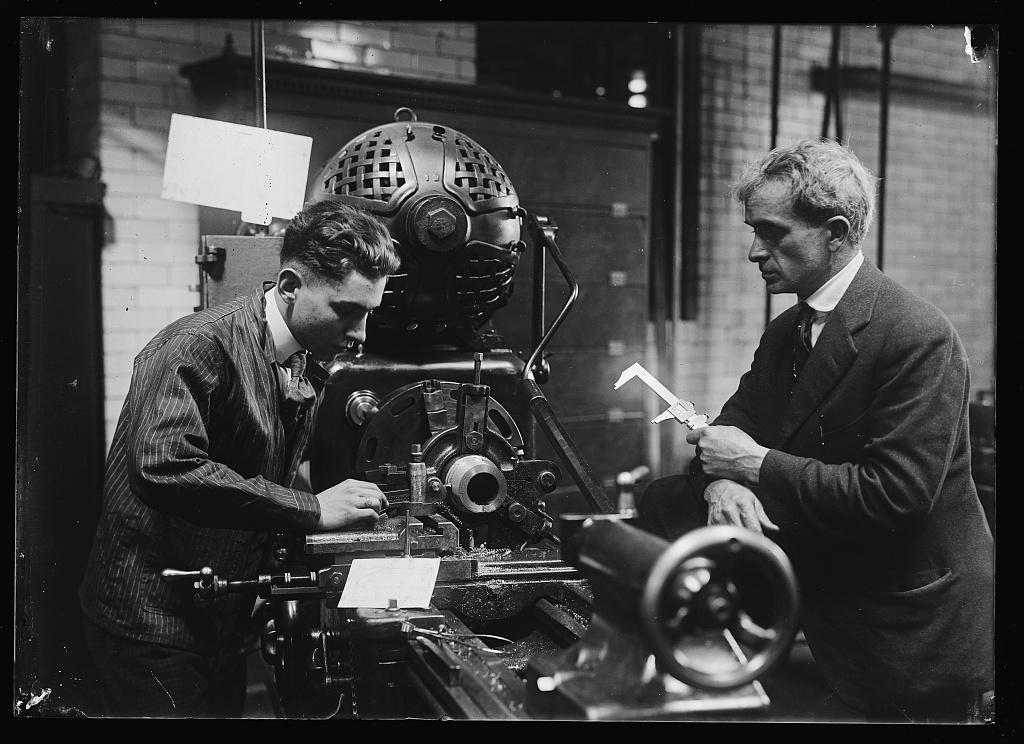
Student receiving instruction in machine tools in 1917

The need for a dedicated technical educational institution in the nation's capital was first met in 1902, when congress established Manual Training School #1, quickly renamed William McKinley Manual Training School. The school initially operated as a branch of Central High School (now Cardozo Senior High School), receiving the approximately 300 students and 15 which comprised Central's manual training program. Manual Training School #1 was segregated for white students, while Manual Training School #2 (later Armstrong Technical High School) was segregated for colored students. The first building occupied by McKinley was a purpose-built structure now known as Shaw Junior High School, located at the intersection of 7th Street and Rhode Island Avenue in Shaw. After McKinley moved to its current campus in Eckington, the building was occupied by the eponymous Shaw Junior High School before being abandoned in 1977. Today, the building is used for residences.

Explosive growth which nearly doubled the population of the District in the 30 years since the conception of a dedicated technical school led to overcrowding at the Shaw site, with more than 500 students enrolled by 1926. In the 1920s plans began to be formed for a new building and campus.

The school was exclusively for white residents of the City of Washington from its founding. District of Columbia Public Schools specifically were racially integrated following the Supreme Court decision in Bolling v. Sharpe, though the case was decided on the same day as the landmark Brown v. Board of Education case. McKinley integrated extremely rapidly in the following years due to the quality of the school and its extensive facilities combined with an exodus of white students and their families from the District (white flight).

Enrollment had fallen from a peak of 2,400 in the late 1960s to approximately 500 by the mid-1990s. The school was selected for closure during the period of the congressionally authorized financial control board, finally shuttering in June 1997.

During the mayoral election campaign of 1998, then Chief Financial Officer Anthony A. Williams promised the city a technology-focused high school to connect city youth with the growing technology base of the Washington-area economy. After assuming the position of Mayor in January 1999, planning began on a school that did not have a decided location. In 2000 a decision was made to place the new school in the closed McKinley facility. Plans at that time included placing incubator companies in the facility and using the facility for professional development for the DC Public Schools and for the growing charter schools movement, none of which were implemented. In July 2001, the school's opening was delayed from 2002 to 2003. In January 2002, Daniel Gohl assumed the role of Founding Principal, coming from the Science Academy of Austin in Austin, Texas. In October 2002 the DC School Board again delayed the opening to September 2004, with renovations to the older campus and modernization in a manner consistent with its intended role as a technology school cited as reasons for the delay. The school finally reopened on September 1, 2004, for grades 9 and 10. By the start of the 2006-07 school year, McKinley had finally enrolled a complete program for grades 9-12 and a population of 800 students.

McKinley earned National Blue Ribbon School honors in 2012 and 2022.

== Academics ==
When founded in 1902, Manual Training School #1 initially only offered manual and technical training and did not have the full curriculum of a senior high school.

Today, McKinley Tech is a STEM-focused DCPS application high school. Students focus on one of three courses of study: Engineering, Information Technology (Networking, Computer Science, and Digital Media), or Biotechnology.

== Campus ==
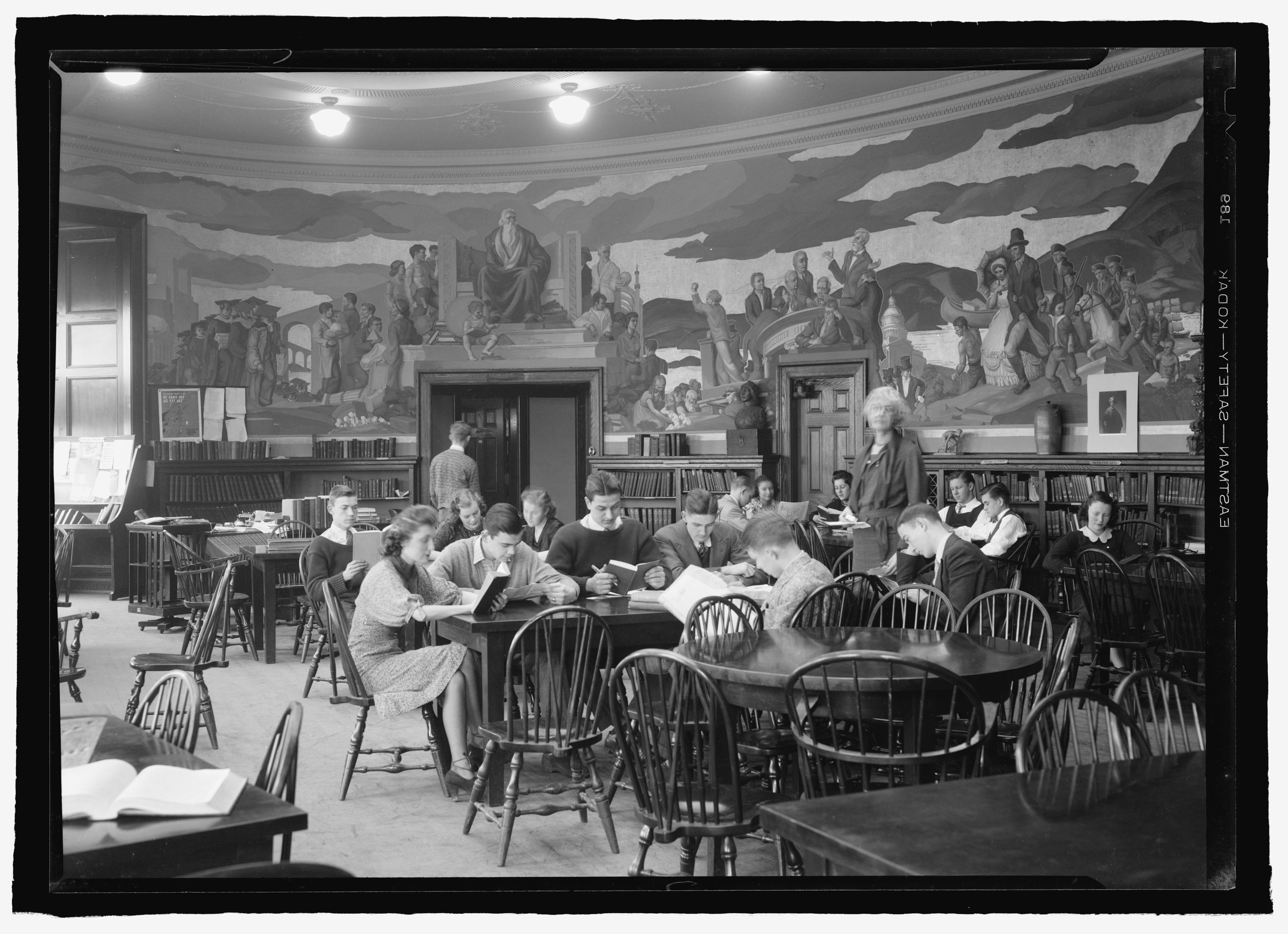
McKinley Tech's library in 1936, featuring large WPA mural

McKinley Tech is located on a large hillside campus occupying most of the city block bounded by Lincoln Road, T Street, 2nd St, and R St. The campus contains four main structures and a multipurpose athletics field.

The main school building is a three-wing structure located on the northeast corner of the campus, fronting the intersection of T and 2nd streets. The main building is clearly visible from much of the eastern part of Washington due to its elevation prominence, and the main entrance overlooks a sweeping view of the downtown and monumental skyline of the District. Originally built in 1926 with congressional funds, it contains two mirrored wings containing three stories of classrooms meeting at a right angle at the intersection, with one protruding to the west and the other to the south. A third wing containing an auditorium and basement lunch facilities is located at a 45-degree angle to the two main wings, projecting towards the interior of the campus and hosting the main monumental entrance to the school. Courtyards at the basement level occupy spaces between the auditorium wing and the two classroom wings on both sides, connected to the cafeteria and open to students as part of the lunchroom space. Engineering, computer science, and biology labs are located in the classrooms of the main building while a greenhouse was built on the second floor on top of the corridor linking the main building to the gymnasium. The school's library is located on the third floor at the intersection of the three wings, and features two book storage and reading areas as well as a large skylight. When built a large mural was painted on the interior wall of the library, however it is not visible today and its fate is unknown. Today, a portion of the western wing is occupied by McKinley Middle School.

The secondary educational building on the western side of the main building was originally home to Langley Junior High School, constructed at the same time as McKinley as an all-white institution. Langley was one of the first purpose-built middle schools in the District, alongside MacFarland Junior High School in Petworth. It saw similar trends in enrollment and integration to McKinley, and eventually transitioned to an elementary school which still operates today.

The gymnasium has its own separate 3-story building, located directly to the south of the main structure's south wing. The main feature is the basketball court and open area, fitted today with retractable bleachers and multiple hoops. Locker rooms, offices, and athletic training areas are located on the west and north sides of the building on the main and second floors, while classrooms are located on the east side of the building on both floors and the basement. Now closed, the basement at one point hosted a shooting range used by JROTC and other military programs over the years. The gym is connected to the main building via a corridor which serves as a direct extension of the main hallway of the south wing. Between 1929 and 1940 and again in 1942–43, the gym served as a home court for the Georgetown Hoyas basketball team.

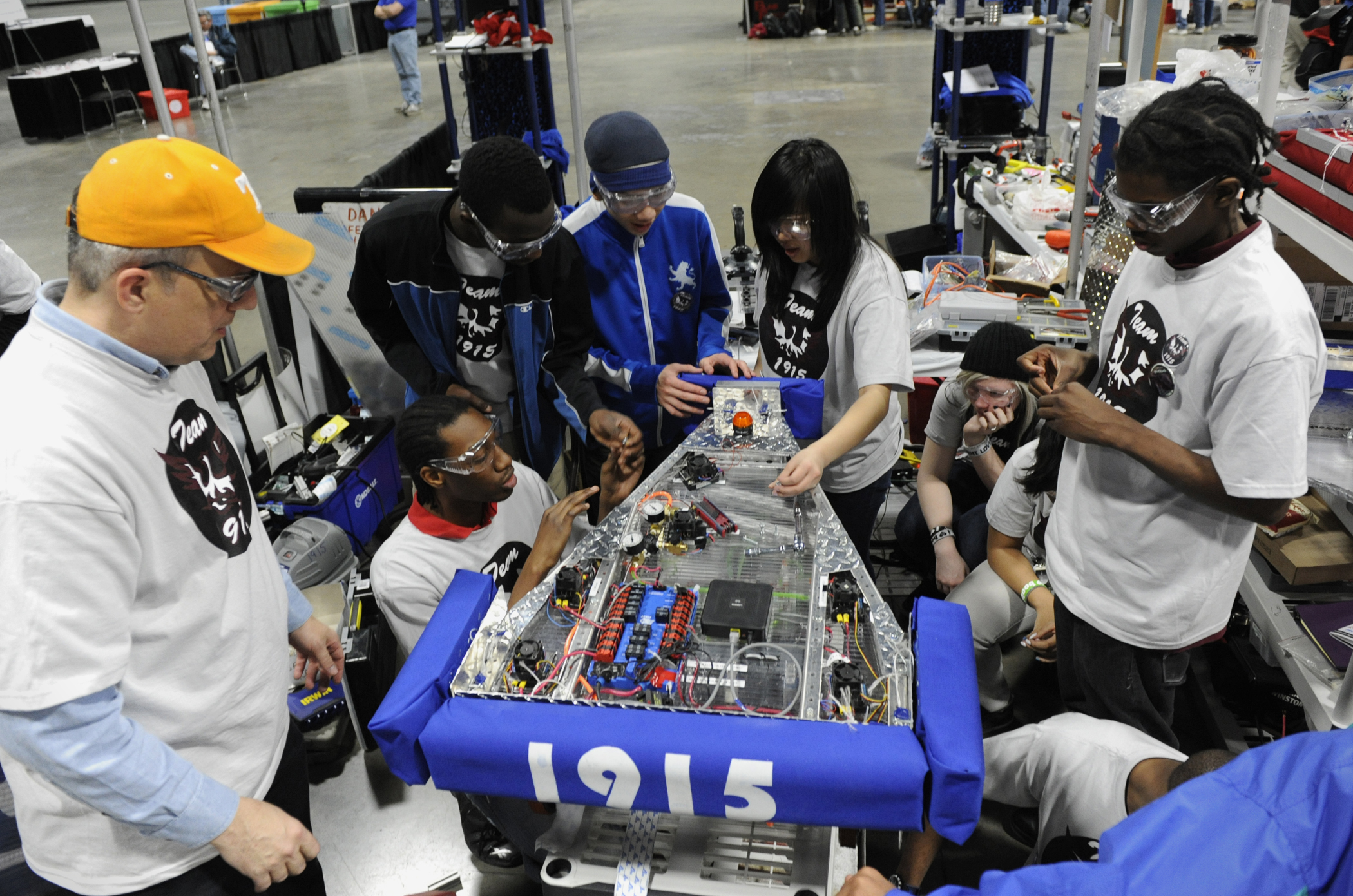
Firebird Robotics team competing in FIRST Robotics in 2010

Located to the south of the gymnasium is a former steam heating plant currently used as an engineering laboratory. Renovations before reopening initially had the structure rebuilt for multimedia usage with recording studios for school and DCPS usage, however these were vacated soon after McKinley reopened. Today, the three-story structure is home to the school's robotics team, Firebird Robotics, which uses the space for a sprawling lab complex hosting manual and automatic tools as well as industrial-scale machines and a parts repository. The team competes in a variety of leagues including FIRST Robotics Competition, the DC EV Grand Prix, NASA Human Exploration Rover Challenge, and more.

McKinley's stadium and athletic field is located at southwest corner of the campus. Initially constructed in the 1920s with the rest of the school, it takes advantage of the hillside the campus is located on to build a row of sloped bleachers directly into the ground similar to the Stadium Bowl in Tacoma, Washington. When first built, the playing area contained both a football field and a baseball diamond. Today, the stadium is home to a turf football field encircled by a 400-meter track and has a structure for snack sales and media production on top of the stands. Restrooms are located underneath the bleachers at field level at each end. Enclosed batting cages exist at the eastern edge of the complex while track and field facilities are located behind each end zone.

== Athletics ==
The McKinley has competed in high school athletics since its inception in 1902. Historically, the team fielded dominant teams in the prewar era with most of its titles coming before 1950.

Today, the Trainers compete in the DCIAA, a league for District of Columbia Public Schools. The school competes in baseball, bowling, boys' basketball (JV and varsity), boys' soccer, cheerleading, cross country, flag football, football, girls' basketball, girls' soccer, indoor track, softball, swimming, tennis, track, and volleyball.

== Notable alumni ==
- Tim Bassett, forward, New York Nets
- John Battle, former professional NBA player (Cleveland Cavaliers)
- Charlie Brotman, Presidential inauguration announcer, longtime Redskins P.A. announcer, and publicist for Sugar Ray Leonard
- David Carliner, immigration and civil rights lawyer
- Arthur Cook, Olympic sport shooter
- Jack Edmonds, mathematician and computer scientist
- Francine Haskins, multi-media textile artist and book illustrator
- Dennis F. Hightower, Former Deputy Secretary, US Department of Commerce; former president, Walt Disney Television & Telecommunications
- Tony Jannus, early aviator.
- Gene Littles, All-American guard, High Point College basketball, ABA Carolina Cougars, NBA coach
- Bill Martin, former professional NBA player (Indiana Pacers)
- John Mauchly, inventor ENIAC computer (first large supercomputer)
- Michael Morgan, conductor
- Lonnie Perrin, fullback, Denver Broncos
- James Ray (singer) R&B singer
- Joseph Paul Reason, Admiral, US Navy (Retd). First African American Four-star Admiral
- Joe Rosenthal, U.S. Marine, photographer
- David Gray Ross, Maryland House of Delegates and a judge with the Prince George's County Circuit Court
- Richard Smallwood, gospel artist, director, Richard Smallwood Singers
- Jean Edward Smith, author
- Emmet G. Sullivan, judge
- Edward Thiele, U.S. Coast Guard Rear Admiral
- Orlando Vega, forward, Puerto Rican Olympic and national basketball teams
- Red Webb, former Major League Baseball player (New York Giants)
- Gig Young, Academy Award for Best Supporting Actor for his performance in the film They Shoot Horses, Don't They?
- William Seifriz, University of Pennsylvania professor
