= 1919–20 NCAA men's basketball season =

Men's collegiate basketball season

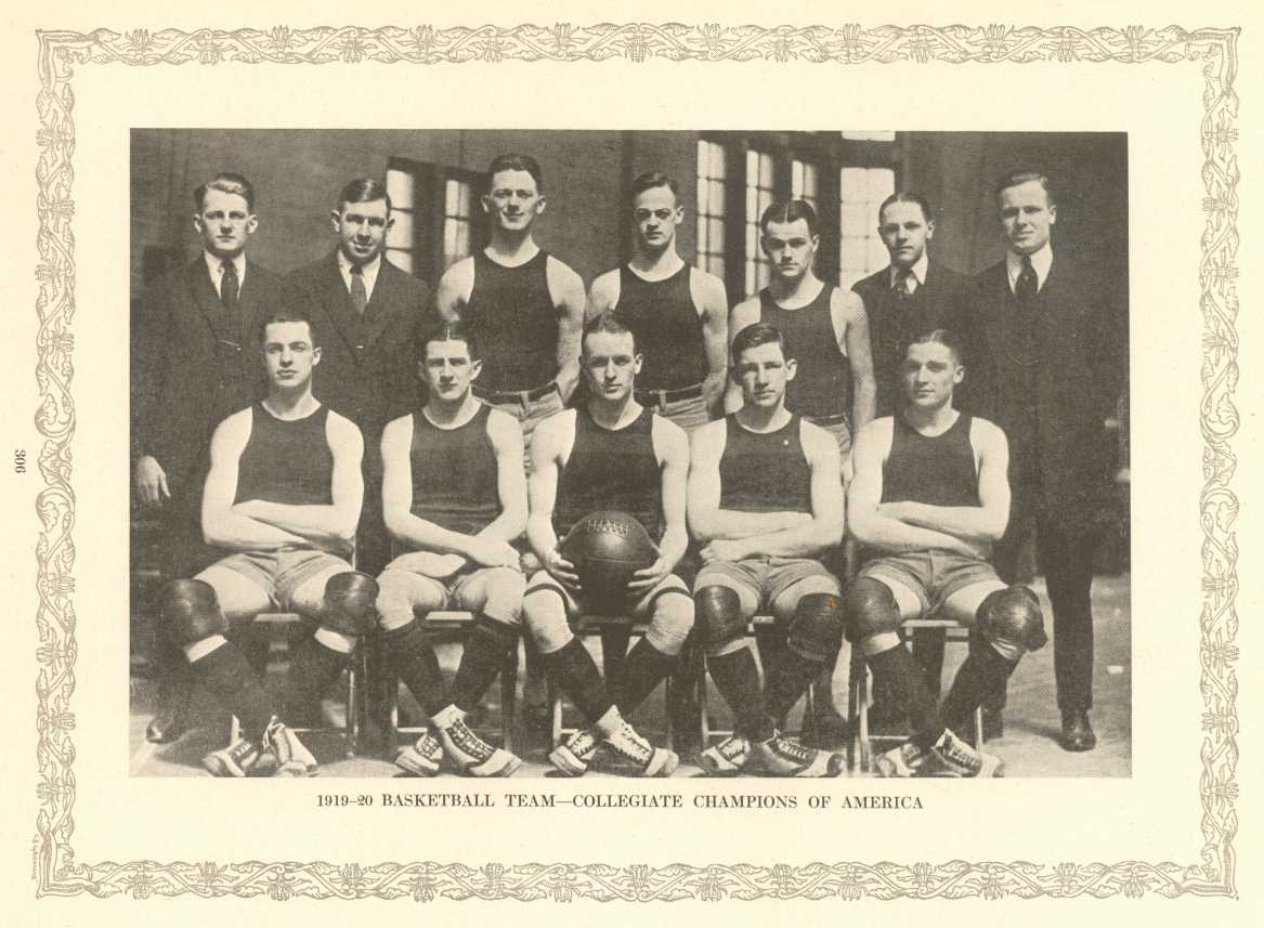
- Penn Quakers, Collegiate Champions of America
- Helms National Champions: Penn Quakers (retroactive selection in 1943)
- Player of the Year (Helms): Howard Cann, NYU (retroactive selection in 1944)

The 1919–20 NCAA men's basketball season began in December 1919, progressed through the regular season, and concluded in March 1920.

== Season headlines ==
- Penn of the Eastern Intercollegiate Basketball League met Chicago of the Big Ten Conference in a three-game national championship playoff, with the first game at Chicago, the second at Penn, and the third at Princeton University. Chicago won the first game 28–24, and Penn the second game, 29-18, after which Penn students celebrated all night and threw bricks and fired shots at policemen. Penn also won the third game, 23-21, and claimed the mythical national championship. On February 25, 1921, the Atlanta Constitution ran an article by sportswriter Walter Camp in which Camp observed that the Chicago-Penn championship series had demonstrated the need for a national standardization of college basketball rules and the interpretation of them and expressed the view that no way of determining a national champion yet existed in college basketball.
- NYU, led by Howard Cann, won the post-season Amateur Athletic Union (AAU) national championship tournament by defeating Rutgers, 49-24. NYU became the second of only four collegiate teams to win the tournament — in which a mix of collegiate and non-collegiate amateur teams competed — and the only one to do so between 1916 and 1924.
- In February 1943, the Helms Athletic Foundation retroactively selected Penn as its national champion for the 1919–20 season.
- In 1995, the Premo-Porretta Power Poll retroactively selected Penn as its top-ranked team for the 1919–20 season.

== Conference membership changes ==
School	Former Conference	New Conference
Nebraska Cornhuskers	Missouri Valley Intercollegiate Athletic Association	Independent
Oklahoma Sooners	Independent	Missouri Valley Intercollegiate Athletic Association
Phillips Haymakers	No major basketball program	Southwest Conference

== Regular season ==
=== Conferences ===
==== Conference winners ====
Conference	Regular Season Winner	Conference Player of the Year	Conference Tournament	Tournament Venue (City)	Tournament Winner
Big Ten Conference	Chicago	None Selected	No Tournament		
Eastern Intercollegiate Basketball League	None^{[a]}	None Selected	No Tournament		
Missouri Valley Intercollegiate Athletic Association	Missouri	None Selected	No Tournament		
Pacific Coast Conference	Stanford	None Selected	No Tournament		
Rocky Mountain Athletic Conference	Colorado		No Tournament		
Southern Intercollegiate Athletic Association	Vanderbilt	None Selected	No Tournament		
Southwest Conference	Texas A&M	None Selected	No Tournament		

^{a} Dartmouth was unable to field a team, so Eastern Intercollegiate Basketball League conference play was informal in 1919–20 and no official champion was declared. However, had a champion been named, Penn would have won the regular-season championship with a 7–1 conference record.

==== Conference standings ====
1919–20 Big Ten Conference men's basketball standings
	Conf.				Overall
Team	W		L	PCT	W		L	PCT
Chicago	10	–	2	.833	14	–	4	.778
Purdue	8	–	2	.800	16	–	4	.800
Illinois	8	–	4	.667	9	–	4	.692
Indiana	6	–	4	.600	13	–	8	.619
Wisconsin	7	–	5	.583	15	–	5	.750
Iowa	6	–	6	.500	9	–	10	.474
Ohio State	3	–	9	.250	17	–	10	.630
Minnesota	3	–	9	.250	7	–	9	.438
Michigan	3	–	9	.250	10	–	13	.435
Northwestern	2	–	6	.250	3	–	7	.300

1919–20 Pacific Coast Conference men's basketball standings
	Conf.				Overall
Team	W		L	PCT	W		L	PCT
Stanford	9	–	1	.900	8	–	3	.727
California	5	–	5	.500	8	–	5	.615
Washington State	6	–	7	.462	10	–	11	.476
Oregon Agricultural	5	–	7	.417	7	–	12	.368
Washington	5	–	7	.417	7	–	8	.467
Oregon	5	–	8	.385	8	–	9	.471
As of 1920

1919–20 Eastern Intercollegiate Basketball League standings
	Conf.				Overall
Team	W		L	PCT	W		L	PCT
Penn	10	–	0	1.000	22	–	1	.957
Princeton	6	–	4	.600	16	–	6	.727
Yale	6	–	4	.600	16	–	9	.640
Cornell	4	–	6	.400	14	–	6	.700
Columbia	3	–	7	.300	4	–	10	.286
Dartmouth	1	–	9	.100	5	–	20	.200

1919–20 Rocky Mountain Conference standings
	Conf.				Overall
Team	W		L	PCT	W		L	PCT
Colorado†		–		–	6	–	4	.600
Colorado Mines		–		–	3	–	8	.273
Colorado College		–		–	9	–	6	.600
Colorado Agricultural		–		–	5	–	5	.500
Denver		–		–	1	–	8	.111
† Official championship winner

1919–20 Missouri Valley Intercollegiate Athletic Association men's basketball standings
	Conf.				Overall
Team	W		L	PCT	W		L	PCT
Missouri	17	–	1	.944	17	–	1	.944
Washington University	11	–	5	.688	13	–	5	.722
Kansas	9	–	7	.563	11	–	7	.611
Kansas State	8	–	8	.500	10	–	8	.556
Oklahoma	3	–	7	.300	9	–	7	.563
Drake	3	–	7	.300	12	–	11	.522
Iowa State	2	–	10	.167	6	–	12	.333
Grinnell	1	–	9	.100	4	–	10	.286

1919–20 Southwest Conference men's basketball standings
	Conf.				Overall
Team	W		L	PCT	W		L	PCT
Texas A&M	16	–	0	1.000	19	–	0	1.000
Phillips	2	–	1	.667	0	–	0	–
Texas	4	–	6	.400	10	–	6	.625
Rice	2	–	5	.286	5	–	6	.455
SMU	2	–	8	.200	4	–	9	.308
Baylor	1	–	7	.125	8	–	13	.381

=== Independents ===
A total of 130 college teams played as major independents. Among independents that played at least 10 games, Montana State (13–0), North Dakota (16–0), Southwestern (14–0), and Westminster (17–0) were undefeated, and Millikin (22–1) and Nebraska (22–2) finished with the most wins.

1919–20 NCAA men's basketball independents standings
	Conf.				Overall
Team	W		L	PCT	W		L	PCT
Montana State		–		–	13	–	0	1.000
North Dakota		–		–	16	–	0	1.000
Northern Arizona Normal		–		–	2	–	0	1.000
Southwestern (Kan.)		–		–	14	–	0	1.000
The Citadel		–		–	9	–	0	1.000
Utah State		–		–	2	–	0	1.000
Washington and Lee		–		–	6	–	0	1.000
Westminster (Mo.)		–		–	17	–	0	1.000
Millikin		–		–	22	–	1	.957
New York University		–		–	16	–	1	.941
Georgetown		–		–	13	–	1	.929
Penn State		–		–	12	–	1	.923
Nebraska		–		–	22	–	2	.917
VMI		–		–	11	–	1	.917
Wyoming		–		–	10	–	1	.909
Louisiana State		–		–	19	–	2	.905
Buffalo		–		–	9	–	1	.900
Central Missouri		–		–	17	–	2	.895
Franklin		–		–	8	–	1	.889
Creighton		–		–	15	–	2	.882
WPI		–		–	14	–	2	.875
Delaware		–		–	13	–	2	.867
Akron		–		–	12	–	2	.857
Army		–		–	12	–	2	.857
UCLA		–		–	12	–	2	.857
Ripon		–		–	11	–	2	.846
Tulsa		–		–	16	–	3	.842
Marietta		–		–	15	–	3	.833
Syracuse		–		–	15	–	3	.833
Utah		–		–	5	–	1	.833
Idaho		–		–	14	–	3	.824
Navy		–		–	14	–	3	.824
CCNY		–		–	13	–	3	.813
DePauw		–		–	13	–	3	.813
Southern California		–		–	8	–	2	.800
Stevens Institute		–		–	12	–	3	.800
Tennessee		–		–	11	–	3	.786
Nevada		–		–	7	–	2	.778
Vanderbilt		–		–	14	–	4	.778
Virginia Tech		–		–	14	–	4	.778
Seton Hall		–		–	10	–	3	.769
Virginia		–		–	10	–	3	.769
Marquette		–		–	9	–	3	.750
Niagara		–		–	6	–	2	.750
Washburn		–		–	12	–	4	.750
Denison		–		–	11	–	4	.733
Rutgers		–		–	11	–	4	.733
Wooster		–		–	11	–	4	.733
Toledo		–		–	8	–	3	.727
Western State Normal		–		–	8	–	3	.727
Birmingham–Southern		–		–	5	–	2	.714
Canisius		–		–	10	–	4	.714
Trinity (N.C.)		–		–	10	–	4	.714
Mississippi A&M		–		–	12	–	5	.706
Bucknell		–		–	14	–	6	.700
Colgate		–		–	16	–	7	.696
Carleton		–		–	9	–	4	.692
Ole Miss		–		–	9	–	4	.692
Wake Forest		–		–	9	–	4	.692
North Carolina State		–		–	11	–	5	.688
Brigham Young		–		–	4	–	2	.667
Gettysburg		–		–	6	–	3	.667
Grove City		–		–	13	–	7	.650
Arizona		–		–	9	–	5	.643
Miami (Ohio)		–		–	9	–	5	.643
Detroit		–		–	12	–	7	.632
Kalamazoo		–		–	12	–	7	.632
Tempe Normal		–		–	5	–	3	.625
North Dakota Agricultural		–		–	10	–	6	.625
Wabash		–		–	13	–	8	.619
Millsaps		–		–	8	–	5	.615
Springfield (Mass.)		–		–	8	–	5	.615
Auburn		–		–	11	–	7	.611
Pittsburgh		–		–	9	–	6	.600
St. Joseph's		–		–	9	–	6	.600
Valparaiso		–		–	12	–	8	.600
Connecticut		–		–	7	–	5	.583
Mount Union		–		–	7	–	5	.583
Clemson		–		–	8	–	6	.571
Fordham		–		–	12	–	9	.571
Georgia		–		–	9	–	7	.563
Temple		–		–	9	–	7	.563
New Mexico A&M		–		–	5	–	4	.556
Louisville		–		–	6	–	5	.545
West Virginia		–		–	12	–	10	.545
Geneva		–		–	10	–	9	.526
Michigan State Normal		–		–	12	–	11	.522
Fairmount		–		–	8	–	8	.500
Muhlenberg		–		–	8	–	9	.471
North Carolina		–		–	8	–	9	.471
Union (N.Y.)		–		–	8	–	9	.471
Ohio		–		–	5	–	6	.455
Washington College		–		–	5	–	6	.455
Montana		–		–	7	–	9	.438
Alabama		–		–	5	–	7	.417
Kentucky		–		–	5	–	7	.417
Lehigh		–		–	5	–	7	.417
William & Mary		–		–	5	–	7	.417
Georgia Tech		–		–	7	–	10	.412
Indiana State		–		–	4	–	6	.400
St. John's (N.Y.)		–		–	9	–	14	.391
South Carolina		–		–	7	–	11	.389
Dayton		–		–	5	–	8	.385
Duquesne		–		–	6	–	10	.375
St. Bonaventure		–		–	6	–	10	.375
Northern Colorado		–		–	4	–	7	.364
Cincinnati		–		–	5	–	9	.357
Tulane		–		–	5	–	9	.357
Beloit		–		–	5	–	10	.333
Bradley		–		–	5	–	10	.333
Brown		–		–	5	–	10	.333
Butler		–		–	2	–	4	.333
Kent State Normal		–		–	2	–	4	.333
Santa Clara		–		–	2	–	4	.333
Bowling Green State		–		–	4	–	9	.308
Lafayette		–		–	3	–	7	.300
Notre Dame		–		–	5	–	13	.278
Rhode Island State		–		–	3	–	8	.273
Davidson		–		–	3	–	10	.231
Richmond		–		–	3	–	10	.231
Saint Louis		–		–	2	–	11	.154
Furman		–		–	2	–	12	.143
Texas Christian		–		–	1	–	7	.125
Manhattan		–		–	1	–	8	.111
Loyola (Md.)		–		–	1	–	11	.083
Oklahoma A&M		–		–	1	–	12	.077
Boston University		–		–	0	–	6	.000
New Mexico		–		–	0	–	3	.000
Saint Mary's (Calif.)		–		–	0	–	6	.000
Xavier		–		–	0	–	3	.000

=== Premo-Porretta Power Poll ===
St. Bonaventure University accounting professor Patrick M. Premo and computer programmer Phil Porretta researched teams from the 1895–96 through the 1947–48 seasons, reviewing results, opponents, and margins of victory to create retroactive polls for the seasons predating the debut of the AP Poll. In 1995, they released their retroactive annual rankings as the Premo-Porretta Power Poll. Their poll for the 1919–20 season is below.

1920 Premo-Porretta Power Poll
Ranking	Team
1	Penn (22–1)
2	Missouri (17–1)
3	NYU (16–1)
4	Penn State (12–1)
5	Texas A&M (19–0)
6	Georgetown (13–1)
7	Purdue (16–4)
8	Chicago (27–8)
9	Delaware (13–2)
10	Southwestern (Kan.) (20–0)
11	Navy (14–3)
12	VMI (11–1)
13	Westminster (Mo.) (17–0)
14	Army (12–2)
15	Montana State (13–0)
16	Nebraska (22–2)
17	Buffalo (9–1)
18	Syracuse (15–3)
19	DePauw (13–3)
20	Nevada (7–2)
21	North Dakota (16–0)
22	CCNY (13–3)
23	Millikin (24–1)
24	Stevens Tech (12–3)
25	Worcester Polytechnic Institute (14–2)

== Post-season ==
Penn of the Eastern Intercollegiate Basketball League met Chicago of the Big Ten Conference in a three-game national championship playoff, with the first game at Chicago, the second at Penn, and the third at Princeton University. Chicago won the first game 28–24, and Penn the second game, 29-18. Penn won the third game, 23-21, to win the championship.

== Award winners ==
=== Helms College Basketball All-Americans ===
The practice of selecting a Consensus All-American Team did not begin until the 1928–29 season. The Helms Athletic Foundation later retroactively selected a list of All-Americans for the 1919–20 season.

Player	Team
Howard Cann	New York University
Chuck Carney	Illinois
Erving Cook	Washington
Forrest DeBernardi	Westminster (Mo.)
George Gardner	Southwestern (Kan.)
Tony Hinkle	Chicago
Dan McNichol	Pennsylvania
Hubert Peck	Pennsylvania
George Sweeney	Pennsylvania
George Williams	Missouri

=== Major player of the year awards ===
- Helms Foundation Player of the Year: Howard Cann, New York University

== Coaching changes ==
A number of teams changed coaches during the season and after it ended.

Team	Former Coach	Interim Coach	New Coach	Reason
Alabama	Bill Moore		Charles A. Bernier	
Baylor	Charles Mosley		Frank Bridges	
Bradley	Fred Brown		Alfred J. Robertson	Robertson also became the athletic director, baseball coach, and football coach.
Brown	Ed Freeman		Florence Harvey	
Bucknell	Malcolm Musser		Clarence Glass	
Butler	F. E. Ellis		Harlan Page	
BYU	E. L. Roberts		lvin Twitchell	
California	Bill Hollander		Earl Wright	
Canisius	Edward C. Miller		Mike Sweeney	
Clemson	Country Morris		Larry Conover	
Columbia	Claus Benson		Joseph Deering	
Creighton	Tommy Mills		Eddie Mulholland	
Dayton	Harry Solimano		Dutch Thiele	
Denver	George Koonsman		Thomas Thompson	
Drexel	James Barrett		William McAvoy	
Duquesne	Eugene McGuigan		Ben Lubic	
Fairmount	Kenneth Cassidy		Wilmer D. Elfrink	
Fordham	Arthur Devlin		Orson Kinney	
Georgia Tech	William Alexander		Joe Bean	
Idaho	Ralph Hutchinson		Dave MacMillan	
Illinois	Ralph Jones		Frank Winters	
Indiana	Ewald O. Stiehm		George Levis	
Iowa State	Punk Berryman		Maury Kent	
Kansas State	Zora Clevenger		E. A. Knoth	
Lafayette	William McAvoy		Bill Anderson	
Louisiana State	Charles C. Stroud		Branch Bocock	
Louisville	Tuley Brucker		Jimmie Powers	
Manhattan	Edward Hanrahan		Edward P. Winters	
Marquette	John J. Ryan		Frank Murray	
Michigan State	George Gauthier		Lyman Frimodig	
Missouri	Walter Meanwell		J. Craig Ruby	
Montana Agricultural	Walter D. Powell		D. V. Graves	Powell left to coach at Stanford.
New Mexico A&M	John G. Griffith		Dutch Bergman	
Northern Arizona Normal	Gus O'Connor		Lacey Eastburn	
Northwestern	J. Norman Elliott		Ray Elder	
Notre Dame	Gus Dorais		Walter Halas	
Ohio	Frank Gullum		Russ Finsterwald	
Oregon	Charles A. Huntington		George Bohler	
Oregon Agricultural	Homer Woodson Hargiss		Dick Rutherford	
Penn	Lon Jourdet		Edward McNichol	
Princeton	Frederick Luehring		Lewis Sugarman	
Rice	Leslie Mann		Pete Cawthon	
Rhode Island State	Fred Murray		Frank Keaney	
Saint Mary's (Calif.)	Percival Ritchie		H. C. McDonald	
South Carolina	Dixon Foster		Sol Metzger	
St. Bonaventure	Richard Phelan		Al Carmont	
Stanford	Bob Evans		Walter D. Powell	
Toledo	Watt Hobt		Darrell Fox	
Texas Christian	Ted D. Hackney		William L. Driver	
Texas	Berry Whitaker		L. Theo Bellmont	
Texas A&M	William L. Driver		Dana X. Bible	
Trinity (N. C.)	Walter Rothensies		Floyd J. Egan	
Tulane	M. A. Moenck		Claude Simons Sr.	
Virginia Tech	Charles A. Bernier		William L. Younger	
Wake Forest	Bill Holding		James L. White	
Xavier	Harry Gilligan		Joseph A. Meyer	
