= 1919–20 University of Virginia men's basketball team =

American college basketball season

1919–20 University of Virginia men's basketball
- Conference: South Atlantic Intercollegiate Athletic Association
- Record: 10–3 (6–1 SAIAA)
- Head coach: Henry Lannigan (15th season)
- Home arena: Fayerweather Gymnasium

The 1919–20 University of Virginia men's basketball team represented the University of Virginia during the 1919–20 NCAA men's basketball season. The team was led by fifteenth-year head coach Henry Lannigan, and played their home games at Fayerweather Gymnasium in Charlottesville, Virginia. Now known as the Virginia Cavaliers, the team did not have an official nickname prior to 1923.

== Schedule ==
Date time, TV	Opponent	Result	Record	Site city, state
Regular season
January 14* no, no	Lynchburg Athletic Club	W 36–16	1–0	Fayerweather Gymnasium; Charlottesville, VA
January 17* no, no	Randolph–Macon	W 29–12	2–0	Fayerweather Gymnasium; Charlottesville, VA
January 20 no, no	Richmond	W 55–13	3–0	Fayerweather Gymnasium; Charlottesville, VA
January 21* no, no	at Navy	L 15–34	3–1	Dahlgren Hall; Annapolis, MD
January 30* no, no	Auburn	L 21–27	3–2	Fayerweather Gymnasium; Charlottesville, VA
January 31 no, no	vs. VMI	L 13–44	3–3	Lynchburg, VA
February 7 no, no	North Carolina	W 40–25	4–3 (2–1)	Fayerweather Gymnasium; Charlottesville, VA
February 14* no, no	Camp Humphreys	W 30–26	5–3 (2–1)	Fayerweather Gymnasium; Charlottesville, VA
February 19 no, no	at St. John's	W 39–18	6–3 (3–1)	Annapolis, MD
February 20 no, no	vs. Johns Hopkins	W 33–28	7–3 (4–1)	Richmond, VA
February 23* no, no	Duke	W 28–20	8–3 (4–1)	Fayerweather Gymnasium; Charlottesville, VA
February 26 no, no	at Richmond	W 46–17	9–3 (5–1)	Raleigh, NC
February 27 no, no	vs. North Carolina	W 37–31	10–3 (6–1)	Raleigh, NC
*Non-conference game. (#) Tournament seedings in parentheses. All times are in Eastern Time.
