= List of Wichita State Shockers head football coaches =

The Wichita State Shockers football program was a college football team that represented Wichita State University until the school discontinued the sport. The team had 32 head coaches since its first recorded game in 1897. The final head coach was Ron Chismar, who first took the position for the 1984 season.

== Key ==
Key to symbols in coaches list
General		Overall		Conference		Postseason (Note: Although the first Rose Bowl Game was played in 1902, it has been continuously played since the 1916 game, and is recognized as the oldest bowl game by the NCAA. "—" indicates any season prior to 1916 when postseason games were not played.)	
No.	Order of coaches (Note: A running total of the number of head coaches, with coaches who served separate tenures being counted only once. Interim head coaches are represented with "Int" and are not counted in the running total. "—" indicates the team played but either without a coach or no coach is on record. "X" indicates an interim year without play.)	GC	Games coached	CW	Conference wins	PW	Postseason wins
DC	Division championships	OW	Overall wins	CL	Conference losses	PL	Postseason losses
CC	Conference championships	OL	Overall losses	CT	Conference ties	PT	Postseason ties
NC	National championships	OT	Overall ties (Note: Overtime rules in college football were introduced in 1996, making ties impossible in the period since.)	C%	Conference winning percentage		
†	Elected to the College Football Hall of Fame	O%	Overall winning percentage (Note: When computing the win–loss percentage, a tie counts as half a win and half a loss.)				

== Coaches ==
No.	Name	Term	GC	OW	OL	OT	O%	CW	CL	CT	C%	PW	PL	CCs	Awards/Notes
01	T. H. Morrison	1897	1	1	0	0	1.000	—	—	—	—	—	—	—	—
—	No coach	1898	1	0	1	0	.000	—	—	—	—	—	—	—	—
02	Harry Hess	1899–1901	22	10	10	2	.500	—	—	—	—	—	—	—	—
03	Guy Peverly	1902	8	4	3	1	.563	—	—	—	—	—	—	—	—
—	No coach	1903	6	2	0	.750	—	—	—	—	—	—	—	—	
04	A. F. Holste	1904	9	4	5	0	.444	—	—	—	—	—	—	—	—
05	Willis Bates	1905–1908	39	28	8	3	.756	—	—	—	—	—	—	—	—
06	Roy K. Thomas	1909–1911	25	15	8	2	.640	—	—	—	—	—	—	—	—
07	E. V. Long	1912–1913	17	6	11	0	.353	—	—	—	—	—	—	—	—
08	Harry Buck	1914–1915	16	6	8	2	.438	—	—	—	—	—	—	—	—
09	Quince Banbury	1918	5	1	4	0	.200	—	—	—	—	—	—	—	—
10	Kenneth Cassidy	1919	8	1	5	2	.250	—	—	—	—	—	—	—	—
11	Wilmer D. Elfrink	1920	9	3	4	2	.444	—	—	—	—	—	—	—	—
12	Lamar Hoover	1916–1922	36	18	14	4	.556	—	—	—	—	—	—	—	—
13	Leonard J. Umnus	1925–1927	23	12	7	4	.609	—	—	—	—	—	—	—	—
14	Sam H. Hill	1923–1929	33	14	14	5	.500	—	—	—	—	—	—	—	—
15	Albert J. Gebert	1930–1941	114	68	40	6	.623	—	—	—	—	—	—	—	—
16	Melvin J. Binford	1944–1945	18	11	6	1	.639	—	—	—	—	—	—	—	—
17	Ralph Graham	1942–1947	30	17	13	0	.567	—	—	—	—	—	—	—	—
18	Jim Trimble	1948–1950	30	13	14	3	.483	—	—	—	—	—	—	—	—
19	Bob Carlson	1951–1952	19	5	13	1	.289	—	—	—	—	—	—	—	—
20	Jack Mitchell	1953–1954	19	13	5	1	.711	—	—	—	—	—	—	—	—
21	Pete Tillman	1955–1956	20	11	8	1	.575	—	—	—	—	—	—	—	—
22	Woody Woodard	1957–1959	30	10	18	2	.367	—	—	—	—	—	—	—	—
23	Hank Foldberg	1960–1961	21	16	5	0	.762	—	—	—	—	—	—	—	—
24	Marcelino Huerta^{†}	1962–1964	29	14	15	0	.483	—	—	—	—	—	—	—	—
25	George Karras	1965–1966	19	4	15	0	.211	—	—	—	—	—	—	—	—
26	Boyd Converse	1967	10	2	7	1	.250	—	—	—	—	—	—	—	—
27	Eddie Kriwiel	1968	10	0	10	0	.000	—	—	—	—	—	—	—	—
28	Ben Wilson	1969–1970	19	2	17	0	.105	—	—	—	—	—	—	—	Was killed in the Wichita State University football team plane crash on October 2, 1970
29	Bob Seaman	1971–1973	33	13	20	0	.394	—	—	—	—	—	—	—	—
30	Jim Wright	1974–1978	55	17	37	1	.318	—	—	—	—	—	—	—	—
31	Willie Jeffries^{†}	1979–1983	55	21	32	2	.400	—	—	—	—	—	—	—	First African American head coach of an NCAA Division I-A football program Elected to the College Football Hall of Fame in 2010.
32	Ron Chismar	1984–1986	33	8	25	0	.242	—	—	—	—	—	—	—	—

== See also ==
- List of Wichita State University people
