= 1919–20 WPI Engineers men's basketball team =

American college basketball season

1919–20 WPI Engineers men's basketball
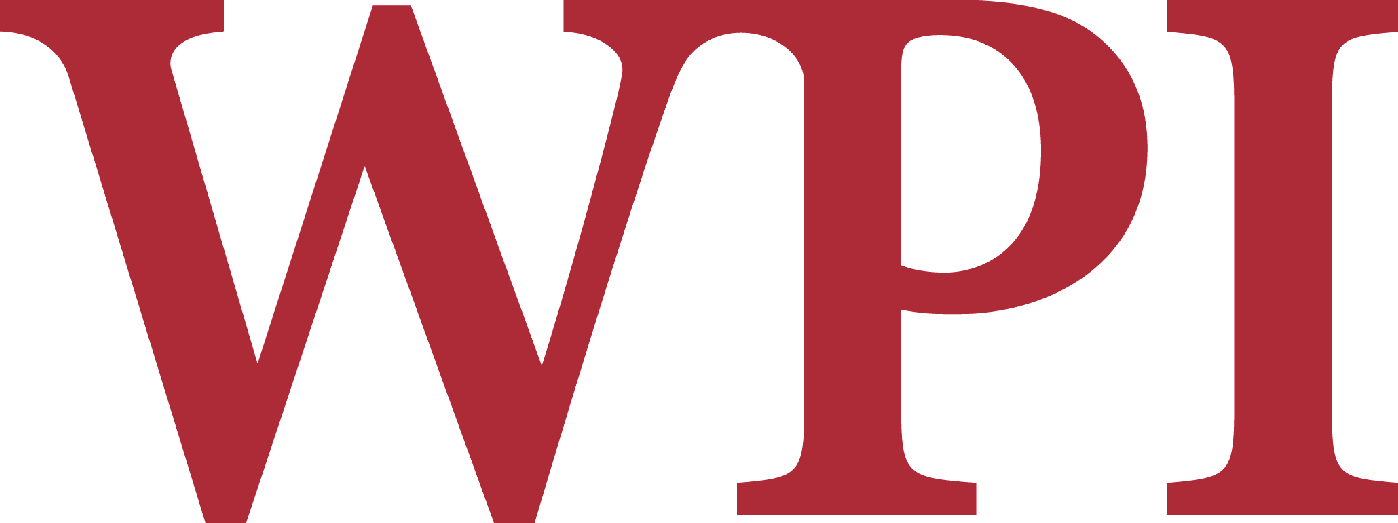

New England Champions
- Conference: Independent

Ranking
- AP: No. 25 (Premo-Porretta Power Poll)
- Record: 14-2
- Head coach: Henry C. Swasey (3rd season)
- Home arena: Alumni Gym

1919–20 NCAA men's basketball northeastern independents standings
	Conf.				Overall
Team	W		L	PCT	W		L	PCT
New York University		–		–	16	–	1	.941
Penn State		–		–	12	–	1	.923
Buffalo		–		–	9	–	1	.900
WPI		–		–	14	–	2	.875
Army		–		–	12	–	2	.857
Syracuse		–		–	15	–	3	.833
CCNY		–		–	13	–	3	.813
Stevens Institute		–		–	12	–	3	.800
Seton Hall		–		–	10	–	3	.769
Niagara		–		–	6	–	2	.750
Rutgers		–		–	11	–	4	.733
Canisius		–		–	10	–	4	.714
Bucknell		–		–	14	–	6	.700
Colgate		–		–	16	–	7	.696
Gettysburg		–		–	6	–	3	.667
Grove City		–		–	13	–	7	.650
Springfield (Mass.)		–		–	8	–	5	.615
Pittsburgh		–		–	9	–	6	.600
St. Joseph's		–		–	9	–	6	.600
Connecticut		–		–	7	–	5	.583
Fordham		–		–	12	–	9	.571
Temple		–		–	9	–	7	.563
Geneva		–		–	10	–	9	.526
Lehigh		–		–	5	–	7	.417
St. John's (N.Y.)		–		–	9	–	14	.391
Duquesne		–		–	6	–	10	.375
St. Bonaventure		–		–	6	–	10	.375
Brown		–		–	5	–	10	.333
Lafayette		–		–	3	–	7	.300
Rhode Island State		–		–	3	–	8	.273
Manhattan		–		–	1	–	8	.111
Boston University		–		–	0	–	6	.000

The 1919–20 WPI Engineers men's basketball team represented Worcester Polytechnic Institute during the 1919–20 NCAA men's basketball season. They were coached by Henry C. Swasey. The Engineers played their home games at Alumni Gym in Worcester, Massachusetts. The team won its first ever championship and finished the season with 14 wins and 2 losses.

== Schedule ==
Date time, TV	Opponent	Result	Record	Site (attendance) city, state
Regular season
01/10/1920*	Brown University	W 29-13	1-0	Alumni Gym (600); Worcester, MA
01/17/1920*	Massachusetts Agriculture College	W 27-13	2-0	Alumni Gym; Worcester, MA
01/23/1920*	at Trinity College	W 26-16	3-0	Hartford, CT
01/24/1920*	at Springfield Y.M.C.A.	W 33-31	4-0	Springfield, MA
01/30/1920*	Stevens Tech	L 25-35	4-1	Alumni Gym; Worcester, MA
01/31/1920*	N.H. State College	W 21-19	5-1	Alumni Gym; Worcester, MA
02/04/1920*	at Clark University	W 61-13	6-1	Worcester, MA
02/13/1920*	at Crescent Athletic Club	L 21-25	6-2	Brooklyn, NY
02/14/1920*	at Pratt Institute	W 30-12	7-2	Brooklyn, NY
02/20/1920*	Trinity College	W 42-24	8-2	Alumni Gym; Worcester, MA
02/21/1920*	Connecticut State College	W 25-17	9-2	Alumni Gym; Worcester, MA
02/27/1920*	at Tufts University	W 31-21	10-2	Medford, MA
02/28/1920*	at N.H. State College	W 26-20	11-2	Durham, NH
03/06/1920*	Tufts University	W 52-29	12-2	Alumni Gym; Worcester, MA
03/13/1920*	Springfield YMCA	W 37-24	13-2	Alumni Gym; Worcester, MA
03/20/1920*	R.I. State College	W 24-11	14-2	Alumni Gym; Worcester, MA
*Non-conference game. (#) Tournament seedings in parentheses.
