= 1919–20 Kent State Normal College men's basketball team =

American college basketball season

1919–20 Kent State Normal College men's basketball
- Conference: Independent
- Record: 2–4
- Head coach: Paul G. Chandler (1st season)

1919–20 NCAA men's basketball midwestern independents standings
	Conf.				Overall
Team	W		L	PCT	W		L	PCT
North Dakota		–		–	16	–	0	1.000
Southwestern (Kan.)		–		–	14	–	0	1.000
Westminster (Mo.)		–		–	17	–	0	1.000
Millikin		–		–	22	–	1	.957
Nebraska		–		–	22	–	2	.917
Central Missouri		–		–	17	–	2	.895
Franklin		–		–	8	–	1	.889
Creighton		–		–	15	–	2	.882
Akron		–		–	12	–	2	.857
Ripon		–		–	11	–	2	.846
Marietta		–		–	15	–	3	.833
DePauw		–		–	13	–	3	.813
Marquette		–		–	9	–	3	.750
Washburn		–		–	12	–	4	.750
Denison		–		–	11	–	4	.733
Wooster		–		–	11	–	4	.733
Toledo		–		–	8	–	3	.727
Western State Normal		–		–	8	–	3	.727
Carleton		–		–	9	–	4	.692
Miami (Ohio)		–		–	9	–	5	.643
Detroit		–		–	12	–	7	.632
Kalamazoo		–		–	12	–	7	.632
North Dakota Agricultural		–		–	10	–	6	.625
Wabash		–		–	13	–	8	.619
Valparaiso		–		–	12	–	8	.600
Mount Union		–		–	7	–	5	.583
Michigan State Normal		–		–	12	–	11	.522
Fairmount		–		–	8	–	8	.500
Ohio		–		–	5	–	6	.455
Indiana State		–		–	4	–	6	.400
Dayton		–		–	5	–	8	.385
Cincinnati		–		–	5	–	9	.357
Beloit		–		–	5	–	10	.333
Bradley		–		–	5	–	10	.333
Butler		–		–	2	–	4	.333
Kent State Normal		–		–	2	–	4	.333
Bowling Green State		–		–	4	–	9	.308
Notre Dame		–		–	5	–	13	.278
Saint Louis		–		–	2	–	11	.154
Xavier		–		–	0	–	3	.000

The 1919–20 Kent State Normal College men's basketball team was the men's basketball team at what is now Kent State University in Kent, Ohio, then known as Kent State Normal College.

The men's basketball team played six games in late 1919 and early 1920, finishing with a record of 2–4. It was the first year for coach Paul G. Chandler, and the resumption of basketball at Kent State after the war years. No team had been fielded during the last two war year seasons.

Games were held in various locations, such as the atrium of the original Administration Building (known as Cartwright Hall since 2006), in the basement of the original heating plant, and in the local Congregational Church gymnasium, as a permanent gymnasium was not built on campus until 1925.

== Schedule and results ==
Date time, TV	Opponent	Result	Record	Site city, state
*	Findlay	L 8–62	0–1	
*	St. Ignatius	W 42–10	1–1	
*	Ashland	L 14–27	1–2	
*	at Davey Tree	L 20–44	1–3	Kent, OH
*	at Ashland	W 28–19	2–3	
*	at Davey Tree	L 25–31	2–4	Kent, OH
*Non-conference game. (#) Tournament seedings in parentheses. Source

== See also ==
- List of Kent State Golden Flashes men's basketball seasons
