= 1919–20 Georgia Bulldogs basketball team =

American college basketball season

1919–20 Georgia Bulldogs basketball
- Conference: Southern Intercollegiate Athletic Association
- Record: 9–7 (8–3 SIAA)
- Head coach: Herman Stegeman (1st season)
- Captain: Kennon Mott

The 1919–20 Georgia Bulldogs basketball team represented the University of Georgia as a member of the Southern Intercollegiate Athletic Association (SIAA) during the 1919–20 NCAA men's basketball season. Led by first-year head coach Herman Stegeman, the Bulldogs compiled an overall record of 9–7 with a mark of 8–3 in conference play. The team captain was Kennon Mott.

== Schedule ==
Date time, TV	Opponent	Result	Record	Site city, state
*	S.E. Christian Col.	W 61–30	1–0	Founders Hall; Atlanta, GA
1/9/1920*	Auburn	W 31–15	2–0	Athens, GA
1/13/1920*	at Furman	W 43–23	3–0	Greenville, SC
1/14/1920*	at Wofford	W 47–23	4–0	Estero, FL
*	Mercer	W 30–15	5–0	Athens, GA
1/23/1920*	Clemson	W 36–22	6–0	Athens, GA
1/28/1920*	at Macon YMCA	L 39–43 ^{OT}	6–1	
2/4/1920*	at Vanderbilt	L 18–40	6–2	Athens, GA
2/11/1920*	LSU	W 34–15	7–2	Athens, GA
*	at Clemson	W 33–24	8–2	Clemson, SC
*	at A.A.C.	L 22–36	8–3	
*	Tulane	W 47–19	9–3	Athens, GA
*	at Auburn	L 29–32	9–4	The Gymnasium; Auburn, AL
*	Mercer	L 31–33	9–5	Athens, GA
*	at A.A.C.	L 18–26	9–6	Athens, GA
*	Rutgers	L 33–36	9–7	Athens, GA
*Non-conference game. (#) Tournament seedings in parentheses.
