= Monon Bell =

Sports trophy

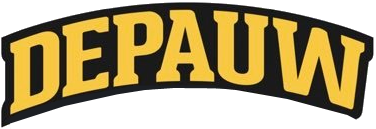
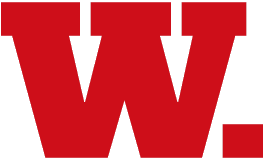
- DePauw Tigers Wabash Little Giants
- First meeting: November 22, 1890; DePauw 34, Wabash 5
- Latest meeting: November 14, 2026; DePauw 16, Wabash 10
- Next meeting: November 13, 2027
- Trophy: Monon Bell

Statistics
- Total meetings: 132
- All-time series: Wabash leads, 63–60–9
- Trophy series: Series tied, 44–44–6
- Largest victory: Wabash, 62–0 (1912)
- Longest win streak: Wabash, 7 (1921–1927, 2009–2015)
- Current win streak: DePauw, 5 (2022–present)

Locations of DePauw and Wabash

The Monon Bell (pronounced MOE-non) is the trophy awarded to the victor of the annual college football matchup between the Wabash College Little Giants (in Crawfordsville, Indiana) and the DePauw University Tigers (in Greencastle, Indiana) in the United States. The Bell is a 300-pound locomotive bell from the Monon Railroad. As of the end of the 2025 regular season, the two teams have played against each other 132 times. Wabash leads the all-time series, 63–60–9, while the series is tied at 44-44-6 since the Bell was introduced as the victor's trophy in 1932.

== Series history ==
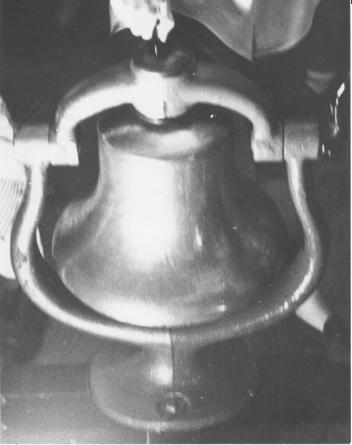
Monon Bell in 1967

The rivalry game between Wabash and DePauw began in 1890 and is among the oldest college football rivalries. The hit 1904 play The College Widow, and its subsequent film adaptations, were loosely based on the rivalry.

The Monon Bell was introduced as a traveling trophy in 1932 at the suggestion of a DePauw alumnus, Orien Fifer (Class of 1925), in a letter to the editor of The Indianapolis News. Since the schools are only 27 miles apart, the adversaries in the game are often brothers, cousins, high school classmates or good friends, adding to the rivalry's intensity. Before the introduction of overtime to college football, nine ties were logged in the series. By rule, in the event of a tie, the Bell was awarded to the previous owner. In the 1960 matchup, DePauw held the Bell and scored a last-minute touchdown to cut Wabash's lead to 13–12. DePauw coach Tommy Mont turned to the stands and spread out his hands. The DePauw fans shouted "Go!" DePauw scored on the conversion and won 14–13. This rule also held significance for the 99th Monon Bell Classic in 1992 in which from the 8-yard line Wabash opted for a field goal to tie the game at 17–17 (the kick hit the right upright, but still went through) and retained ownership of the Bell. This tie set up the 100th game as an evenly split 45–45–9 series, in which Wabash won, 40–26.

The teams failed to play each other only six years in the entire history. From 1897 to 1899, the schools did not schedule each other for an unknown reason. In 1910, the teams didn't play due to the death of Wabash's star halfback, Ralph Lee Wilson, who died from a concussion in a game earlier in the season. The schools have played each other every year since 1911. The 2020 game was cancelled due to the COVID-19 pandemic.

While the series is traditionally played at each other's home, the 2026 game took place at Ball State's Scheumann Stadium instead as DePauw was renovating its football stadium. It was the first time the rivalry was held at a neutral venue since 1922.

== Monon Bell Classic ==
College Comparison
| Category | Wabash | DePauw |
|---|---|---|
| Location | Crawfordsville | Greencastle |
| Team Name | Little Giants | Tigers |
| Students | 950 | 2,350 |
| School Colors | Scarlet | Black & Old Gold |
| Mascot | Wally Wabash | Tyler T. Tiger |
| Conference | NCAC |
| Home Field | Little Giant Stadium | Blackstock Stadium |
| Student Body | All-Male | Co-Ed |

The Monon Bell Classic is an American college football rivalry game played by Wabash College and DePauw University. Named for the Monon Bell, the trophy awarded to the winner, it is the sixth most-played rivalry in NCAA Division III competition and is the twelfth-most played in college football.

The game has received national media coverage including articles in Sports Illustrated in 1973 and 1993, a feature on Charles Kuralt's 1979 "CBS Sunday Morning" show, articles in USA Today in 1987 and the Wall Street Journal in 1999 and a feature on Fox Sports Net's show The Slant in 1999.

The game is regularly televised and past battles have been seen on ABC, ESPN2, AXS TV, and Fox Sports.

Annually, alumni parties are held in more than 50 cities across America where loyal fans from both schools gather to watch the game. Professionally replicated DVDs have been produced of 22 complete contests—the 2000 through 2018 games, as well as the 1977, 1984, 1993 and 1994 Monon Bell Classics.

In 2008, Ken Owen '82, executive director of media relations at DePauw, completed the task of compiling a "Monon Memory" for each and every game in the rivalry series. The clips utilize video/film from the DePauw and Wabash archives, as well as vintage photographs, and are available online and on Monon Bell DVDs. The "Memories" project was the subject of coverage in the Chronicle of Higher Education, Inside Indiana Business, and other media outlets. Owen has since re-cut several of the segments after locating additional archival materials.

Listed below are the all-time Monon Bell Classic results, with Wabash victories shaded in scarlet and DePauw victories are shaded in old gold.

== Bell heists ==
The Bell has been stolen at least nine times (1941, 1959, 1965, 1966, 1973, 1978, 1979, 1988, 1998). The most famous theft is known as "Operation Frijoles," which was ranked by Sports Illustrated as one of the five greatest all-time rivalry pranks. "Operation Frijoles" is still the favorite story shared by Wabash fans regarding the "reappropriation" of the 300-pound trophy claimed each November by either Wabash College or DePauw University in the annual football meeting.

=== Operation Frijoles ===
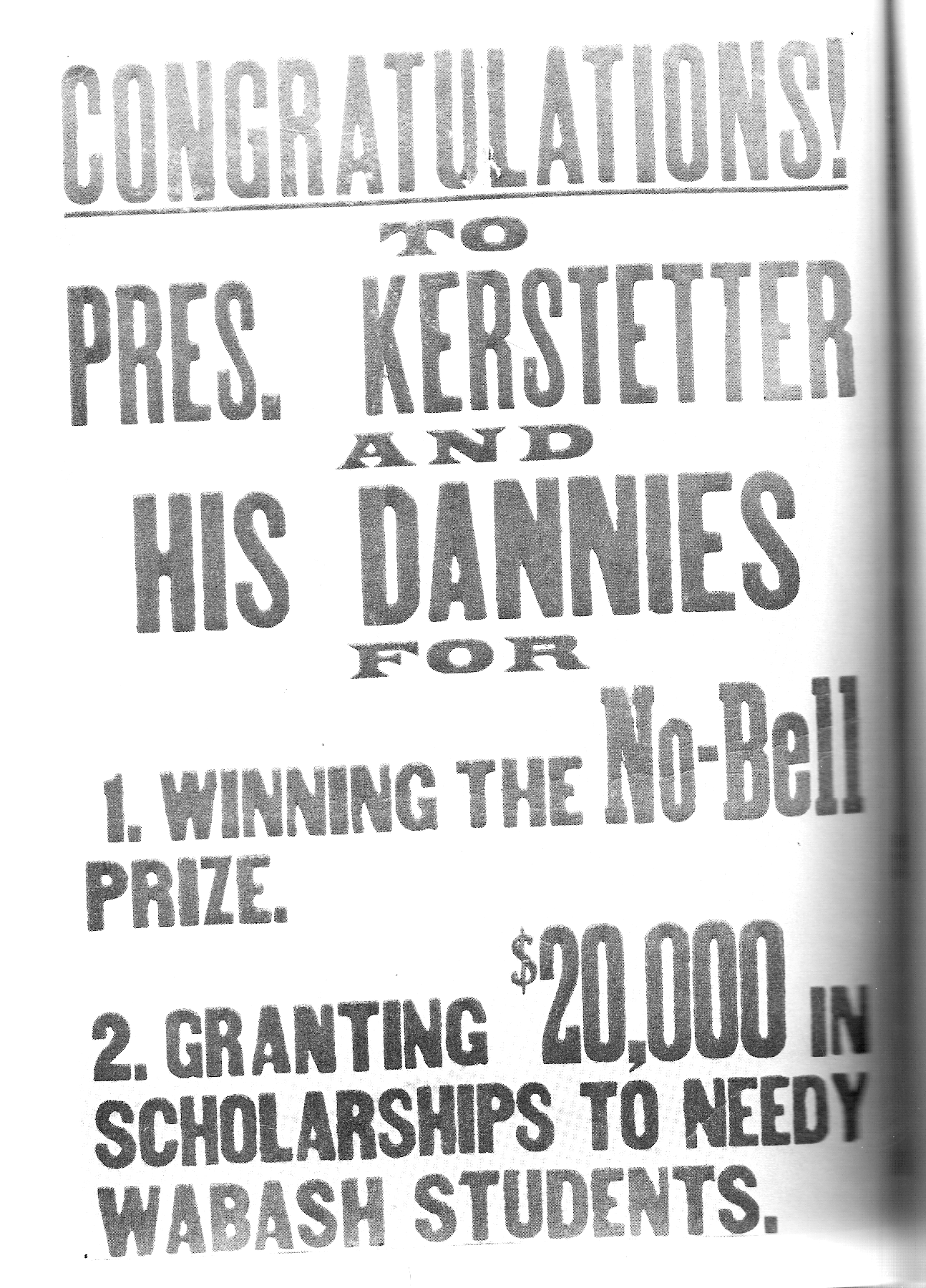
Poster produced after "Operation Frijoles"

Prior to the 1965 meeting between the two teams, Wabash student Jim Shanks '67 scheduled a meeting with DePauw University President William H. Kerstetter, claiming to be representative from the US Information Service in Mexico City. During the meeting with Kerstetter, Shanks was able to convince the president to offer two full scholarships for Mexican students. To "seal the deal" Shanks asked to take photos of various points of interest on campus to show the "prospective" Mexican students more about DePauw University.

One item Shanks asked to photograph was the Monon Bell, in the Tigers' possession after a 22–21 victory in 1964. The dean of the college was the only person on campus who knew the location of the Bell, but was reluctant to tell Shanks of its location. "I don't know whether I should show this to you or not," he said with a laugh. "The last time I showed it to someone, they stole it."

Taken to the second floor of a Quonset hut near the football field, Shanks took careful notes that were reviewed by Wabash students upon his return. The Wabash students decided they would have two groups attempt to retrieve The Bell. The first group that arrived on campus was quickly discovered before attempting the heist and were ordered to either "leave campus or find dates." The Wabash students chose the latter. The second group of students arrived on campus undetected, entered the building, and took the Bell back to Crawfordsville. DePauw's security, upon realizing The Bell was gone, found the first group of Wabash students still on campus. Security questioned the students about the heist but their dates vouched that they had been together the entire night. The Bell was eventually "found" by the Wabash administration and returned to DePauw the day before the 1965 game.

Saturday afternoon the Little Giant football team made certain it was a short visit. Wabash defeated DePauw, 16–6. After every Wabash touchdown, the Wabash fans cheered "Ole!" At the conclusion of the game Wabash fans stormed the field, many wearing sombreros and ponchos, throwing tortillas onto the field and wielding posters congratulating President Kerstetter for the loss of the Bell and the two scholarship offers.

=== Other heists ===
Another famous heist saw DePauw students stealing the bell from themselves. In 1967, concerned about the safety of the Bell from Wabash kidnappers, a group of DePauw students stole the bell from its resting place and buried it in the north end zone of DePauw's Blackstock Stadium. Very few students knew of its location, and many mistakenly believed it had been kidnapped by Wabash students. Shortly after the heist, the temperature dropped well below freezing and there was concern The Bell would be inaccessible for the game. Luckily, the ground thawed and The Bell was unearthed on game day. Wabash wound up leaving with the trophy after a 7–0 victory on the muddy turf.

The Bell was last stolen in 1998 by Wabash students on Halloween.

In 1998, after DePauw had secured the Bell, a fracas broke out on the field of Wabash's Byron P. Hollett Little Giant Stadium and DePauw students pulled down one of the Little Giants' goal posts. The Little Giant student body retaliated by charging the field. The melee was broken up by the local police, which used pepper spray to restrain the visiting crowd. As a result, following Monon Bell Classics have been played with added security and segregated fan sections along with transferring The Bell midway through the fourth quarter to a neutral location if the result of the game is still in doubt.

=== Failed heists ===
One other failed heist occurred by DePauw students. They had succeeded in stealing the bell and had the bell loaded into their car when their car wouldn't start. They were caught red-handed with the bell. They assumed that they would only get a slap on the wrist for the attempted heist. However, because the crime occurred in Montgomery County, where nearly all the judges are Wabash alumni, the students from DePauw got 1,000 hours of community service.

In 2012, DePauw students nearly snatched the bell when several members of the Wabash fraternity Sigma Chi fell asleep guarding it, however they woke up when the bell accidentally rang. In the resulting melee, the handle to the bell was broken, but Wabash was able to retain it.

In October 2017, three Wabash students wearing masks of Barack Obama and Donald Trump attempted to steal the bell from its display case at DePauw's Lilly Center in what is now known as the Failed Bipartisanship Heist. The students were intercepted on their way to a getaway truck after a DePauw police officer noticed the vehicle with its engine running during fall break; the would-be bandits also triggered a hidden pressure sensor, which alerted the DePauw and Greencastle City Police. Out of concern for the students' future employment prospects, the police, the schools, and the students agreed the students only punishment would be cleaning Blackstock Stadium after the game. Many Wabash alumni and other students assisted the clean-up following the game to lighten the burden on the apprehended students.

== The Ballad of the Monon Bell ==
The Ballad of the Monon Bell was introduced the week of the 1985 game at DePauw. The music is by Nancy Ford Charles (DePauw '57), and the lyrics are by Darel Lindquist (DePauw '68). The concept of the ballad originated with Patrick Aikman (DePauw '57). The ballad has been recorded by Jim Ibbotson (of the Nitty Gritty Dirt Band) (DePauw '69). A video, originally created in 1985, was recut in 2007 after tape was found containing a stereo version of the song, and another new version was created in August 2012. A 1985 demo of the song was also found in 2009. (See external links below for an MP3 and MOV of the song.)

Long before the cannonball traveled through her towns
The state of Indiana owned the jewel of the crown
The train, they called the Monon, the stories they still tell
The Giants and the Tigers playing for her bell

It rode like a masthead on engine ninety-nine
Crawfordsville to Greencastle, then further down the line
The Giants came from Wabash, the Tigers from DePauw
Since eighteen-ninety they have played the last game ev’ry fall

Many years they played for pride, oh the stories they could tell
Then in thirty-two the Monon train gave up her precious bell
They said, "Here take this symbol of smoke and fire and grit
And give it to the winner, a symbol not to quit."

Ring the Bell for Wabash, ring for old DePauw
Ring the bell for victory in the last game ev’ry fall
Ring the Bell for Wabash, ring for old DePauw
Ring the bell for victory in the last game ev’ry fall

Suddenly the boys of autumn had fire in their eyes
Blood and spit, but never quit, fighting for the prize
The medal to the victor, the symbol to the school
Wabash and DePauw became a yearly duel

Ring the Bell for Wabash, ring for old DePauw
Ring the bell for victory in the last game ev’ry fall
Ring the Bell for Wabash, ring for old DePauw
Ring the bell for victory in the last game ev’ry fall

Ring the Bell for Wabash, ring for old DePauw
Ring the bell for victory in the last game ev’ry fall
Ring the Bell for Wabash, ring for old DePauw
Ring the bell for victory in the last game ev’ry fall

Now history has recorded the players and their games
And to this day they still play for the Bell in Monon’s name
Those who’ve gone before return each November day
Swapping stories and legends for those who did not play

Ring the Bell for Wabash, ring for old DePauw
Ring the bell for victory in the last game ev’ry fall
Ring the Bell for Wabash, ring for old DePauw
Ring the bell for victory in the last game ev’ry fall

©DePauw University, 1985

== Game results ==
| DePauw victories | Wabash victories | Tie games |

| No. | Date | Location | Winner | Score |
|---|---|---|---|---|
| 1 | November 22, 1890 | Crawfordsville, IN | DePauw | 34–5 |
| 2 | November 21, 1891 | Greencastle, IN | DePauw | 1–0 |
| 3 | November 5, 1892 | Greencastle, IN | DePauw | 42–4 |
| 4 | November 11, 1893 | Crawfordsville, IN | DePauw | 48–34 |
| 5 | October 20, 1894 | Greencastle, IN | Wabash | 16–4 |
| 6 | October 19, 1895 | Crawfordsville, IN | Wabash | 6–0 |
| 7 | October 31, 1896 | Greencastle, IN | DePauw | 20–0 |
| 8 | October 6, 1900 | Crawfordsville, IN | Wabash | 6–0 |
| 9 | November 12, 1900 | Greencastle, IN | DePauw | 26–11 |
| 10 | November 11, 1901 | Greencastle, IN | DePauw | 31–2 |
| 11 | November 18, 1901 | Crawfordsville, IN | DePauw | 35–5 |
| 12 | November 21, 1903 | Crawfordsville, IN | Wabash | 10–0 |
| 13 | November 25, 1905 | Crawfordsville, IN | Wabash | 52–0 |
| 14 | November 17, 1906 | Greencastle, IN | Wabash | 7–0 |
| 15 | November 4, 1907 | Crawfordsville, IN | Wabash | 11–4 |
| 16 | November 20, 1908 | Crawfordsville, IN | Wabash | 12–0 |
| 17 | October 9, 1909 | Greencastle, IN | Tie | 0–0 |
| 18 | October 13, 1911 | Crawfordsville, IN | Tie | 0–0 |
| 19 | October 12, 1912 | Greencastle, IN | Wabash | 62–0 |
| 20 | October 20, 1913 | Crawfordsville, IN | DePauw | 7–0 |
| 21 | November 16, 1914 | Greencastle, IN | DePauw | 3–0 |
| 22 | November 20, 1915 | Crawfordsville, IN | Wabash | 34–0 |
| 23 | November 11, 1916 | Indianapolis, IN | Wabash | 26–13 |
| 24 | November 10, 1917 | Indianapolis, IN | DePauw | 7–0 |
| 25 | November 23, 1918 | Crawfordsville, IN | DePauw | 28–6 |
| 26 | November 8, 1919 | Indianapolis, IN | Tie | 0–0 |
| 27 | November 20, 1920 | Indianapolis, IN | DePauw | 3–0 |
| 28 | November 19, 1921 | Indianapolis, IN | Wabash | 22–0 |
| 29 | November 25, 1922 | Indianapolis, IN | Wabash | 30–0 |
| 30 | November 24, 1923 | Crawfordsville, IN | Wabash | 17–0 |
| 31 | November 22, 1924 | Greencastle, IN | Wabash | 21–0 |
| 32 | November 21, 1925 | Crawfordsville, IN | Wabash | 22–0 |
| 33 | November 20, 1926 | Greencastle, IN | Wabash | 6–0 |
| 34 | November 19, 1927 | Crawfordsville, IN | Wabash | 13–7 |
| 35 | November 24, 1928 | Greencastle, IN | DePauw | 20–12 |
| 36 | November 23, 1929 | Crawfordsville, IN | Wabash | 8–7 |
| 37 | November 22, 1930 | Greencastle, IN | DePauw | 7–6 |
| 38 | November 21, 1931 | Crawfordsville, IN | DePauw | 13–7 |
| 39 | November 19, 1932 | Greencastle, IN | Tie | 0–0 |
| 40 | November 18, 1933 | Crawfordsville, IN | DePauw | 14–0 |
| 41 | November 17, 1934 | Greencastle, IN | Wabash | 7–6 |
| 42 | November 16, 1935 | Crawfordsville, IN | Tie | 0–0 |
| 43 | November 14, 1936 | Greencastle, IN | Wabash | 19–0 |
| 44 | November 13, 1937 | Crawfordsville, IN | DePauw | 32–0 |
| 45 | November 12, 1938 | Greencastle, IN | DePauw | 7–0 |

| No. | Date | Location | Winner | Score |
|---|---|---|---|---|
| 46 | November 18, 1939 | Crawfordsville, IN | DePauw | 7–0 |
| 47 | November 16, 1940 | Greencastle, IN | Wabash | 17–13 |
| 48 | November 15, 1941 | Crawfordsville, IN | Wabash | 27–19 |
| 49 | November 14, 1942 | Greencastle, IN | DePauw | 6–3 |
| 50 | October 16, 1943 | Greencastle, IN | DePauw | 33–0 |
| 51 | October 21, 1944 | Crawfordsville, IN | Wabash | 14–7 |
| 52 | September 22, 1945 | Greencastle, IN | DePauw | 13–7 |
| 53 | November 16, 1946 | Crawfordsville, IN | Wabash | 26–0 |
| 54 | November 15, 1947 | Greencastle, IN | Wabash | 27–7 |
| 55 | November 13, 1948 | Crawfordsville, IN | DePauw | 8–0 |
| 56 | November 12, 1949 | Greencastle, IN | Wabash | 25–21 |
| 57 | November 18, 1950 | Crawfordsville, IN | Wabash | 34–20 |
| 58 | November 17, 1951 | Greencastle, IN | Wabash | 41–12 |
| 59 | November 15, 1952 | Crawfordsville, IN | Wabash | 47–0 |
| 60 | November 14, 1953 | Greencastle, IN | Wabash | 41–0 |
| 61 | November 13, 1954 | Crawfordsville, IN | Wabash | 28–0 |
| 62 | November 12, 1955 | Greencastle, IN | DePauw | 23–20 |
| 63 | November 17, 1956 | Crawfordsville, IN | Tie | 7–7 |
| 64 | November 16, 1957 | Greencastle, IN | DePauw | 37–6 |
| 65 | November 15, 1958 | Crawfordsville, IN | DePauw | 24–8 |
| 66 | November 14, 1959 | Greencastle, IN | Tie | 6–6 |
| 67 | November 12, 1960 | Crawfordsville, IN | DePauw | 14–13 |
| 68 | November 18, 1961 | Greencastle, IN | DePauw | 20–7 |
| 69 | November 17, 1962 | Crawfordsville, IN | DePauw | 13–10 |
| 70 | November 16, 1963 | Greencastle, IN | DePauw | 17–0 |
| 71 | November 14, 1964 | Crawfordsville, IN | DePauw | 22–21 |
| 72 | November 13, 1965 | Greencastle, IN | Wabash | 16–6 |
| 73 | November 12, 1966 | Crawfordsville, IN | DePauw | 9–7 |
| 74 | November 11, 1967 | Greencastle, IN | Wabash | 7–0 |
| 75 | November 16, 1968 | Crawfordsville, IN | DePauw | 18–7 |
| 76 | November 15, 1969 | Greencastle, IN | DePauw | 17–7 |
| 77 | November 7, 1970 | Crawfordsville, IN | DePauw | 14–13 |
| 78 | November 13, 1971 | Greencastle, IN | Wabash | 16–7 |
| 79 | November 11, 1972 | Crawfordsville, IN | Wabash | 20–14 |
| 80 | November 10, 1973 | Greencastle, IN | DePauw | 28–21 |
| 81 | November 16, 1974 | Crawfordsville, IN | DePauw | 15–12 |
| 82 | November 15, 1975 | Greencastle, IN | DePauw | 14–8 |
| 83 | November 13, 1976 | Crawfordsville, IN | Wabash | 14–7 |
| 84 | November 12, 1977 | Greencastle, IN | Wabash | 30–6 |
| 85 | November 11, 1978 | Crawfordsville, IN | Wabash | 11–3 |
| 86 | November 10, 1979 | Greencastle, IN | Wabash | 16–13 |
| 87 | November 8, 1980 | Crawfordsville, IN | Tie | 22–22 |
| 88 | November 14, 1981 | Greencastle, IN | DePauw | 21–14 |
| 89 | November 13, 1982 | Crawfordsville, IN | Wabash | 31–6 |
| 90 | November 12, 1983 | Greencastle, IN | DePauw | 16–10 |

| No. | Date | Location | Winner | Score |
|---|---|---|---|---|
| 91 | November 10, 1984 | Crawfordsville, IN | Wabash | 41–26 |
| 92 | November 9, 1985 | Greencastle, IN | Wabash | 28–8 |
| 93 | November 8, 1986 | Crawfordsville, IN | Wabash | 24–23 |
| 94 | November 14, 1987 | Greencastle, IN | DePauw | 33–11 |
| 95 | November 12, 1988 | Crawfordsville, IN | DePauw | 24–14 |
| 96 | November 11, 1989 | Greencastle, IN | DePauw | 41–14 |
| 97 | November 10, 1990 | Crawfordsville, IN | DePauw | 20–13 |
| 98 | November 16, 1991 | Greencastle, IN | Wabash | 23–18 |
| 99 | November 14, 1992 | Crawfordsville, IN | Tie | 17–17 |
| 100 | November 13, 1993 | Greencastle, IN | Wabash | 40–26 |
| 101 | November 12, 1994 | Crawfordsville, IN | Wabash | 28–24 |
| 102 | November 11, 1995 | Greencastle, IN | Wabash | 7–2 |
| 103 | November 16, 1996 | Crawfordsville, IN | DePauw | 31–13 |
| 104 | November 15, 1997 | Greencastle, IN | DePauw | 14–7 |
| 105 | November 14, 1998 | Crawfordsville, IN | DePauw | 42–7 |
| 106 | November 13, 1999 | Greencastle, IN | DePauw | 21–7 |
| 107 | November 11, 2000 | Crawfordsville, IN | DePauw | 27–17 |
| 108 | November 10, 2001 | Greencastle, IN | Wabash | 27–21 |
| 109 | November 16, 2002 | Crawfordsville, IN | Wabash | 35–7 |
| 110 | November 15, 2003 | Greencastle, IN | Wabash | 37–20 |
| 111 | November 13, 2004 | Crawfordsville, IN | DePauw | 14–7 |
| 112 | November 12, 2005 | Greencastle, IN | Wabash | 17–14 |
| 113 | November 11, 2006 | Crawfordsville, IN | Wabash | 23–20 |
| 114 | November 10, 2007 | Greencastle, IN | DePauw | 24–21 |
| 115 | November 15, 2008 | Crawfordsville, IN | DePauw | 36–14 |
| 116 | November 14, 2009 | Greencastle, IN | Wabash | 32–19 |
| 117 | November 13, 2010 | Crawfordsville, IN | Wabash | 47–0 |
| 118 | November 12, 2011 | Greencastle, IN | Wabash | 45–7 |
| 119 | November 10, 2012 | Crawfordsville, IN | Wabash | 23–0 |
| 120 | November 16, 2013 | Greencastle, IN | Wabash | 38–21 |
| 121 | November 15, 2014 | Crawfordsville, IN | Wabash | 27–3 |
| 122 | November 14, 2015 | Greencastle, IN | Wabash | 45–17 |
| 123 | November 12, 2016 | Crawfordsville, IN | DePauw | 37–34 |
| 124 | November 11, 2017 | Greencastle, IN | Wabash | 22–21 |
| 125 | November 10, 2018 | Crawfordsville, IN | Wabash | 24–17 |
| 126 | November 16, 2019 | Greencastle, IN | DePauw | 17–13 |
| 127 | November 13, 2021 | Crawfordsville, IN | Wabash | 42–35 |
| 128 | November 12, 2022 | Greencastle, IN | DePauw | 49–14 |
| 129 | November 11, 2023 | Crawfordsville, IN | DePauw | 33–30 |
| 130 | November 16, 2024 | Greencastle, IN | DePauw | 42–21 |
| 131 | November 15, 2025 | Crawfordsville, IN | DePauw | 41–20 |
| 132 | November 14, 2026 | Muncie, IN | DePauw | 16–10 |
| 133 | November 13, 2027 | Crawfordsville, IN | | |
Series: Wabash leads 63–60–9
