= 1919–20 NC State Wolfpack men's basketball team =

American college basketball season

1919–20 NC State Wolfpack men's basketball
- Conference: Independent
- Record: 11–5
- Head coach: Richard Crozier (1st season)
- Captain: Franklin Cline

The 1919–20 NC State Wolfpack men's basketball team represented North Carolina State University during the 1919–20 NCAA men's basketball season. The head coach was Richard Crozier coaching the team in his first season. The Wolfpack's team captain was Franklin Cline.

== Schedule ==
Date time, TV	Opponent	Result	Record	Site city, state
*	Durham YMCA	W 38–18	1–0	Raleigh, NC
*	at Duke	L 22–28	1–1	The Ark; Durham, NC
*	Elon	W 40–17	2–1	Raleigh, NC
*	Davidson	W 30–10	3–1	Raleigh, NC
*	Wake Forest	W 38–23	4–1	Raleigh, NC
*	Guilford	W 44–25	5–1	Raleigh, NC
*	at Virginia Tech	L 17–42	5–2	Blacksburg, VA
*	Lynchburg A.C.	W 34–25	6–2	Raleigh, NC
*	at Washington & Lee	W 25–23	7–2	Lexington, VA
*	at Guilford	W 33–25	8–2	Greensboro, NC
*	Charlotte YMCA	L 33–42	8–3	Raleigh, NC
*	at Davidson	W 37–19	9–3	Alumni Gymnasium; Davidson, NC
*	at North Carolina	L 12–42	9–4	Chapel Hill, NC
*	Wake Forest	W 30–18	10–4	Winston-Salem, NC
*	North Carolina	W 32–21	11–4	Raleigh, NC
*	Durham YMCA	L 24–25	11–5	Raleigh, NC
*Non-conference game. (#) Tournament seedings in parentheses.
