= 1919–20 Ohio Bobcats men's basketball team =

American college basketball season

1919–20 Ohio Bobcats men's basketball
- Conference: Ohio Athletic Conference
- Record: 5–6 (4–4 OAC)
- Head coach: Frank Gullum (2nd season)
- Home arena: Ohio Gymnasium

1919–20 NCAA men's basketball midwestern independents standings
	Conf.				Overall
Team	W		L	PCT	W		L	PCT
North Dakota		–		–	16	–	0	1.000
Southwestern (Kan.)		–		–	14	–	0	1.000
Westminster (Mo.)		–		–	17	–	0	1.000
Millikin		–		–	22	–	1	.957
Nebraska		–		–	22	–	2	.917
Central Missouri		–		–	17	–	2	.895
Franklin		–		–	8	–	1	.889
Creighton		–		–	15	–	2	.882
Akron		–		–	12	–	2	.857
Ripon		–		–	11	–	2	.846
Marietta		–		–	15	–	3	.833
DePauw		–		–	13	–	3	.813
Marquette		–		–	9	–	3	.750
Washburn		–		–	12	–	4	.750
Denison		–		–	11	–	4	.733
Wooster		–		–	11	–	4	.733
Toledo		–		–	8	–	3	.727
Western State Normal		–		–	8	–	3	.727
Carleton		–		–	9	–	4	.692
Miami (Ohio)		–		–	9	–	5	.643
Detroit		–		–	12	–	7	.632
Kalamazoo		–		–	12	–	7	.632
North Dakota Agricultural		–		–	10	–	6	.625
Wabash		–		–	13	–	8	.619
Valparaiso		–		–	12	–	8	.600
Mount Union		–		–	7	–	5	.583
Michigan State Normal		–		–	12	–	11	.522
Fairmount		–		–	8	–	8	.500
Ohio		–		–	5	–	6	.455
Indiana State		–		–	4	–	6	.400
Dayton		–		–	5	–	8	.385
Cincinnati		–		–	5	–	9	.357
Beloit		–		–	5	–	10	.333
Bradley		–		–	5	–	10	.333
Butler		–		–	2	–	4	.333
Kent State Normal		–		–	2	–	4	.333
Bowling Green State		–		–	4	–	9	.308
Notre Dame		–		–	5	–	13	.278
Saint Louis		–		–	2	–	11	.154
Xavier		–		–	0	–	3	.000

The 1919–20 Ohio Bobcats men's basketball team represented Ohio University. Frank Gullum was the head coach for Ohio. The Bobcats played their home games in Ohio Gymnasium.

== Schedule ==
Date time, TV	Rank^{#}	Opponent^{#}	Result	Record	Site (attendance) city, state
Regular Season
*		Capital	W 25–24	1–0	Ohio Gymnasium; Athens, OH
		at Kenyon	W 32–15	2–0	Gambier, OH
		at Heidelberg	W 24–13	3–0	Tiffin, OH
		at Denison	L 26–38	3–1	Granville, OH
		Mount Union	L 16–20	3–2	Ohio Gymnasium; Athens, OH
*		at Otterbein	L 16–17	3–3	Westerville, OH
		Cincinnati	L 20–31	3–4	Ohio Gymnasium; Athens, OH
		Akron	L 18–26	3–5	Ohio Gymnasium; Athens, OH
		at Heidelberg	W 35–25	4–5	Ohio Gymnasium; Athens, OH
		Western Reserve	W 24–14	5–5	Ohio Gymnasium; Athens, OH
*		at Capital	W 35–25	4–5	Bexley, OH
*Non-conference game. ^{#}Rankings from AP Poll. (#) Tournament seedings in parentheses. All times are in Eastern Time.
