= 1919–20 Michigan State Normal Normalites men's basketball team =

American college basketball season

1919–20 Michigan State Normal Normalites men's basketball
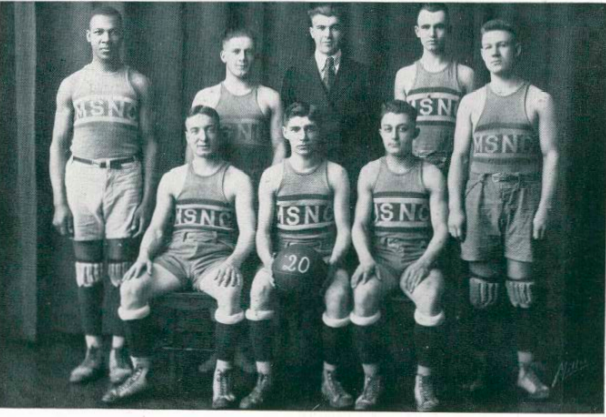
- 1919–20 Eastern Michigan Basketball Team Photo
- Conference: Independent
- Record: 13–2
- Head coach: Elton J. Rynearson (3rd season)
- Home arena: Gymnasium

1919–20 NCAA men's basketball midwestern independents standings
	Conf.				Overall
Team	W		L	PCT	W		L	PCT
North Dakota		–		–	16	–	0	1.000
Southwestern (Kan.)		–		–	14	–	0	1.000
Westminster (Mo.)		–		–	17	–	0	1.000
Millikin		–		–	22	–	1	.957
Nebraska		–		–	22	–	2	.917
Central Missouri		–		–	17	–	2	.895
Franklin		–		–	8	–	1	.889
Creighton		–		–	15	–	2	.882
Akron		–		–	12	–	2	.857
Ripon		–		–	11	–	2	.846
Marietta		–		–	15	–	3	.833
DePauw		–		–	13	–	3	.813
Marquette		–		–	9	–	3	.750
Washburn		–		–	12	–	4	.750
Denison		–		–	11	–	4	.733
Wooster		–		–	11	–	4	.733
Toledo		–		–	8	–	3	.727
Western State Normal		–		–	8	–	3	.727
Carleton		–		–	9	–	4	.692
Miami (Ohio)		–		–	9	–	5	.643
Detroit		–		–	12	–	7	.632
Kalamazoo		–		–	12	–	7	.632
North Dakota Agricultural		–		–	10	–	6	.625
Wabash		–		–	13	–	8	.619
Valparaiso		–		–	12	–	8	.600
Mount Union		–		–	7	–	5	.583
Michigan State Normal		–		–	12	–	11	.522
Fairmount		–		–	8	–	8	.500
Ohio		–		–	5	–	6	.455
Indiana State		–		–	4	–	6	.400
Dayton		–		–	5	–	8	.385
Cincinnati		–		–	5	–	9	.357
Beloit		–		–	5	–	10	.333
Bradley		–		–	5	–	10	.333
Butler		–		–	2	–	4	.333
Kent State Normal		–		–	2	–	4	.333
Bowling Green State		–		–	4	–	9	.308
Notre Dame		–		–	5	–	13	.278
Saint Louis		–		–	2	–	11	.154
Xavier		–		–	0	–	3	.000

The 1919–20 team finished with a record of 13–2. It was the 3rd year for head coach Elton J. Rynearson. Allen Morris was the Captain-Elect.

== Roster ==
Number	Name	Position	Class	Hometown
	Ernest R. Quinn			
	Franklin Austin		Sophomore	Laingsburg, MI
	Cliff Crane		Junior	Linden, MI
	Allen Morris	Center	Senior	Saline, MI
	Bill Williams			
	Chuck Forsythe	Forward	Sophomore	Milan, MI
	Foster A. Evans			
	Marshall Wilkshire			

== Schedule ==
Date time, TV	Rank^{#}	Opponent^{#}	Result	Record	Site (attendance) city, state
Non-conference regular season
*		Alumni	W 33-25	1-0	Gymnasium; Ypsilanti, MI
January 7, 1920*		Bowling Green	W 38-17	2-0	Gymnasium; Ypsilanti, MI
January 14, 1920*		at Wayne State	W 28-19	3-0	Detroit, MI
January 23, 1920*		Assumption University	W 17-16	4-0	Gymnasium; Ypsilanti, MI
January 28, 1920*		Jackson AC	W 28-27	5-0	Gymnasium; Ypsilanti, MI
January 31, 1920*		at Detroit AC	L 28-43	5-1	Detroit, MI
February 6, 1920*		at Jackson AC	W 22-16	6-1	Jackson, MI
February 12, 1920*		at Adrian College	W 24-15	7-1	Adrian, MI
February 14, 1920*		Albion College	W 46-14	8-1	Gymnasium; Ypsilanti, MI
February 18, 1920*		Wayne State	W 43-29 or 41-29	9-1	Gymnasium; Ypsilanti, MI
February 20, 1920*		Detroit AC	W 37-31	10-1	Gymnasium; Ypsilanti, MI
February 26, 1920*		at Bowling Green	W 32-21	11-1	Bowling Green, OH
February 28, 1920*		Alma College	W 36-32	12-1	Gymnasium; Ypsilanti, MI
March 4, 1920*		Adrian College	W 28-25	13-1	Gymnasium; Ypsilanti, MI
March 6, 1920*		Central Michigan	L 12-22	13-2	Gymnasium; Ypsilanti, MI
*Non-conference game. ^{#}Rankings from AP Poll. (#) Tournament seedings in parentheses. All times are in Eastern Time.

== Game Notes ==
=== February 18, 1920 ===
Wayne State has a score of 41-29.
