= 1919–20 Indiana State Sycamores men's basketball team =

American college basketball season

1919–20 Indiana State Sycamores men's basketball
- Conference: Independent
- Record: 4–6
- Head coach: Birch Bayh (2nd season)
- Home arena: North Hall

1919–20 NCAA men's basketball midwestern independents standings
| | Conf. | | | | Overall |
| Team | W | | L | PCT | W | | L | PCT |
|---|---|---|---|---|---|---|---|---|
| North Dakota | | – | | – | 16 | – | 0 | 1.000 |
| Southwestern (Kan.) | | – | | – | 14 | – | 0 | 1.000 |
| Westminster (Mo.) | | – | | – | 17 | – | 0 | 1.000 |
| Millikin | | – | | – | 22 | – | 1 | .957 |
| Nebraska | | – | | – | 22 | – | 2 | .917 |
| Central Missouri | | – | | – | 17 | – | 2 | .895 |
| Franklin | | – | | – | 8 | – | 1 | .889 |
| Creighton | | – | | – | 15 | – | 2 | .882 |
| Akron | | – | | – | 12 | – | 2 | .857 |
| Ripon | | – | | – | 11 | – | 2 | .846 |
| Marietta | | – | | – | 15 | – | 3 | .833 |
| DePauw | | – | | – | 13 | – | 3 | .813 |
| Marquette | | – | | – | 9 | – | 3 | .750 |
| Washburn | | – | | – | 12 | – | 4 | .750 |
| Denison | | – | | – | 11 | – | 4 | .733 |
| Wooster | | – | | – | 11 | – | 4 | .733 |
| Toledo | | – | | – | 8 | – | 3 | .727 |
| Western State Normal | | – | | – | 8 | – | 3 | .727 |
| Carleton | | – | | – | 9 | – | 4 | .692 |
| Miami (Ohio) | | – | | – | 9 | – | 5 | .643 |
| Detroit | | – | | – | 12 | – | 7 | .632 |
| Kalamazoo | | – | | – | 12 | – | 7 | .632 |
| North Dakota Agricultural | | – | | – | 10 | – | 6 | .625 |
| Wabash | | – | | – | 13 | – | 8 | .619 |
| Valparaiso | | – | | – | 12 | – | 8 | .600 |
| Mount Union | | – | | – | 7 | – | 5 | .583 |
| Michigan State Normal | | – | | – | 12 | – | 11 | .522 |
| Fairmount | | – | | – | 8 | – | 8 | .500 |
| Ohio | | – | | – | 5 | – | 6 | .455 |
| Indiana State | | – | | – | 4 | – | 6 | .400 |
| Dayton | | – | | – | 5 | – | 8 | .385 |
| Cincinnati | | – | | – | 5 | – | 9 | .357 |
| Beloit | | – | | – | 5 | – | 10 | .333 |
| Bradley | | – | | – | 5 | – | 10 | .333 |
| Butler | | – | | – | 2 | – | 4 | .333 |
| Kent State Normal | | – | | – | 2 | – | 4 | .333 |
| Bowling Green State | | – | | – | 4 | – | 9 | .308 |
| Notre Dame | | – | | – | 5 | – | 13 | .278 |
| Saint Louis | | – | | – | 2 | – | 11 | .154 |
| Xavier | | – | | – | 0 | – | 3 | .000 |

The 1919–20 Indiana State Sycamores men's basketball team represented Indiana State University during the 1919–20 college men's basketball season. The head coach was Birch Bayh, coaching the Fightin' Teachers in his second season. The team played their home games at North Hall in Terre Haute, Indiana.

== Schedule ==
| Date time, TV | Opponent | Result | Record | Site city, state |
|---|---|---|---|---|
| 12/06/1919 | ISNS Alumni | L 33–34 | 0–1 | North Hall; Terre Haute, IN |
| 12/12/1919 | at DePauw | L 08–61 | 0–2 | Greencastle, IN |
| 1/10/1920 | Eastern Illinois | L | 0–3 | North Hall; Terre Haute, IN |
| 1/17/1920 | at Butler | L 20–26 | 0–4 | Indianapolis, IN |
| 1/24/1920 | at Rose Polytechnic | W 33–21 | 1–4 | North Hall; Terre Haute, IN |
| 1/30/1920 | at Franklin | L 25–43 | 1–5 | Franklin, IN |
| 2/06/1920 | at Eastern Illinois | L 26–27 | 1–6 | Charleston, IL |
| 2/11/1920 | at Rose Polytechnic | W 42–23 | 2–6 | |
| 2/20/1920 | Butler | W 34–22 | 3–6 | North Hall; Terre Haute, IN |
| | Rose Polytechnic | W 27–23 | 4–6 | North Hall; Terre Haute, IN |
*Non-conference game. (#) Tournament seedings in parentheses.
