= 1919–20 Army Cadets men's basketball team =

American college basketball season

1919–20 Army Cadets men's basketball
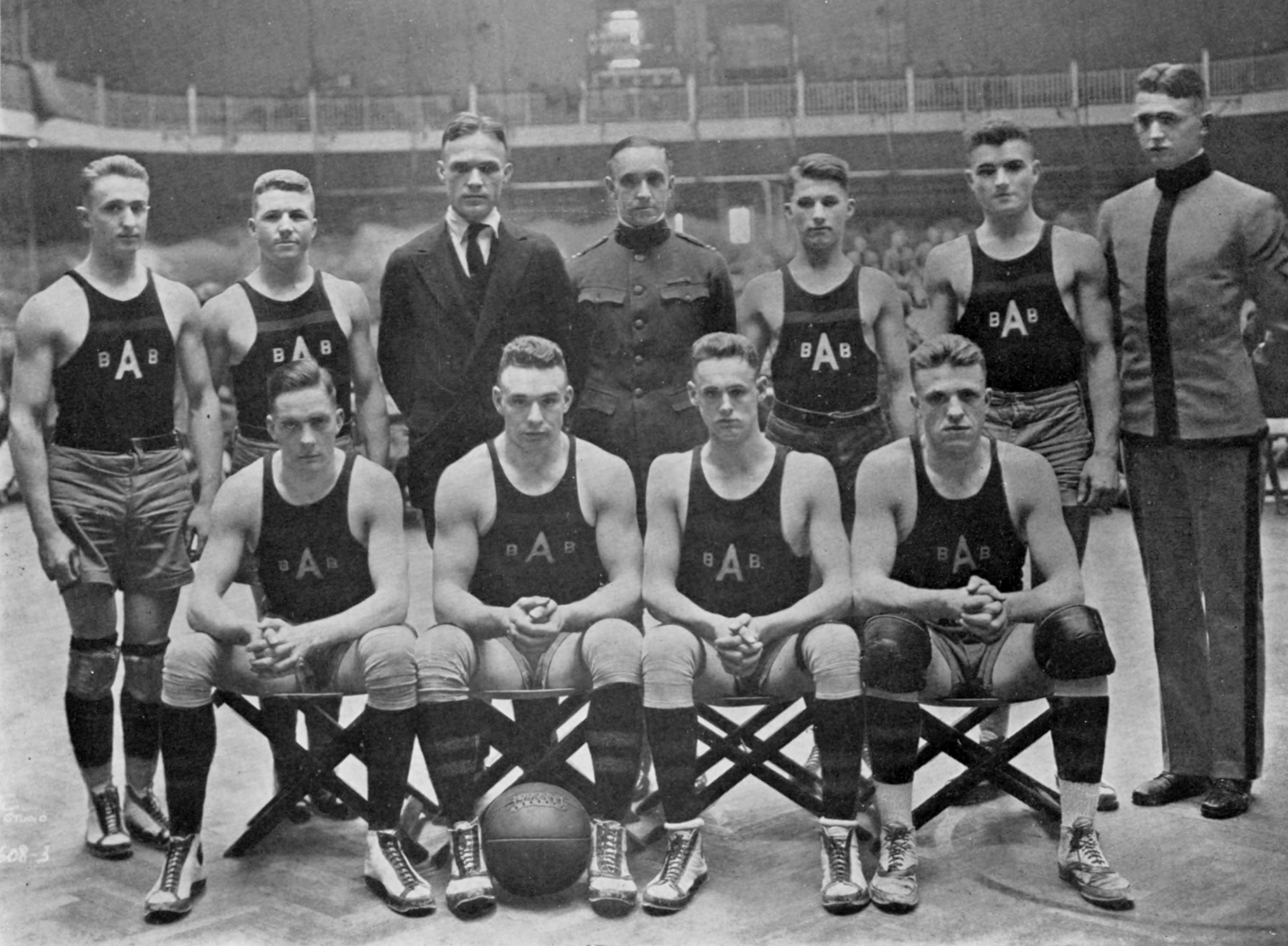
- Conference: Independent
- Record: 12–2
- Head coach: Joseph O'Shea (1st season)
- Captain: Maurice Daniel

1919–20 NCAA men's basketball northeastern independents standings
	Conf.				Overall
Team	W		L	PCT	W		L	PCT
New York University		–		–	16	–	1	.941
Penn State		–		–	12	–	1	.923
Buffalo		–		–	9	–	1	.900
WPI		–		–	14	–	2	.875
Army		–		–	12	–	2	.857
Syracuse		–		–	15	–	3	.833
CCNY		–		–	13	–	3	.813
Stevens Institute		–		–	12	–	3	.800
Seton Hall		–		–	10	–	3	.769
Niagara		–		–	6	–	2	.750
Rutgers		–		–	11	–	4	.733
Canisius		–		–	10	–	4	.714
Bucknell		–		–	14	–	6	.700
Colgate		–		–	16	–	7	.696
Gettysburg		–		–	6	–	3	.667
Grove City		–		–	13	–	7	.650
Springfield (Mass.)		–		–	8	–	5	.615
Pittsburgh		–		–	9	–	6	.600
St. Joseph's		–		–	9	–	6	.600
Connecticut		–		–	7	–	5	.583
Fordham		–		–	12	–	9	.571
Temple		–		–	9	–	7	.563
Geneva		–		–	10	–	9	.526
Lehigh		–		–	5	–	7	.417
St. John's (N.Y.)		–		–	9	–	14	.391
Duquesne		–		–	6	–	10	.375
St. Bonaventure		–		–	6	–	10	.375
Brown		–		–	5	–	10	.333
Lafayette		–		–	3	–	7	.300
Rhode Island State		–		–	3	–	8	.273
Manhattan		–		–	1	–	8	.111
Boston University		–		–	0	–	6	.000

The 1919–20 Army Cadets men's basketball team represented United States Military Academy during the 1919–20 intercollegiate men's basketball season. The head coach was Joseph O'Shea, coaching his first season with the Cadets. The team captain was Maurice Daniel.

== Schedule ==
Date time, TV	Opponent	Result	Record	Site city, state
12/06/1919	St. Johns	W 41–25	1–0	West Point, NY
	Manhattan	W 46–08	2–0	West Point, NY
	NYU	W 17–14	3–0	West Point, NY
	Seton Hall	W 54–07	4–0	West Point, NY
	Springfield Y.M.C.A.	W 39–32	5–0	West Point, NY
	CCNY	L 20–26	5–1	West Point, NY
	Princeton Nassau	W 35–13	6–1	West Point, NY
	Lehigh	W 23–22	7–1	West Point, NY
	St. Lawrence	W 26–23	8–1	West Point, NY
	Union (NY)	W 27–14	9–1	West Point, NY
	Navy	L 18–24	9–2	West Point, NY
	Williams	W 28–25	10–2	West Point, NY
	Brooklyn Poly. Inst.	W 24–22	11–2	West Point, NY
	Crescent A.C.	W 27–15	12–2	West Point, NY
*Non-conference game. (#) Tournament seedings in parentheses.
