= Walter Rothensies =

Biographical details
- Education: Trinity (1920)

Coaching career (HC unless noted)

Basketball
- 1919–20: Trinity

Head coaching record
- Overall: 10–4

Walter J. "Shorty" Rothensies was an American basketball coach. He served as the head coach for the Trinity Blue and White (now the Duke Blue Devils) during the 1919–20 season, compiling a 10–4 record.

He went to school at Trinity from 1916 to 1917, before leaving to fight in World War I. Rothensies returned to finish his degree in the fall of 1919.

== Head coaching record ==
Record table
Season	Team	Overall	Conference	Standing	Postseason
Trinity Blue and White (Independent) (1919–1920)
1919–20	Trinity	10–4			
Trinity:		10–4			
Total:		10–4			
National champion Postseason invitational champion Conference regular season champion Conference regular season and conference tournament champion Division regular season champion Division regular season and conference tournament champion Conference tournament champion
