= 1919–20 Cincinnati Bearcats men's basketball team =

American college basketball season

1919–20 Cincinnati Bearcats men's basketball
- Conference: Ohio Athletic Conference
- Record: 5–9 (4–6 OAC)
- Head coach: Boyd Chambers (2nd season)
- Captain: Nat Cantor
- Home arena: Schmidlapp Gymnasium

1919–20 Eastern Intercollegiate Basketball League standings
	Conf.				Overall
Team	W		L	PCT	W		L	PCT
North Dakota		–		–	16	–	0	1.000
Southwestern (Kan.)		–		–	14	–	0	1.000
Westminster (Mo.)		–		–	17	–	0	1.000
Millikin		–		–	22	–	1	.957
Nebraska		–		–	22	–	2	.917
Central Missouri		–		–	17	–	2	.895
Franklin		–		–	8	–	1	.889
Creighton		–		–	15	–	2	.882
Akron		–		–	12	–	2	.857
Ripon		–		–	11	–	2	.846
Marietta		–		–	15	–	3	.833
DePauw		–		–	13	–	3	.813
Marquette		–		–	9	–	3	.750
Washburn		–		–	12	–	4	.750
Denison		–		–	11	–	4	.733
Wooster		–		–	11	–	4	.733
Toledo		–		–	8	–	3	.727
Western State Normal		–		–	8	–	3	.727
Carleton		–		–	9	–	4	.692
Miami (Ohio)		–		–	9	–	5	.643
Detroit		–		–	12	–	7	.632
Kalamazoo		–		–	12	–	7	.632
North Dakota Agricultural		–		–	10	–	6	.625
Wabash		–		–	13	–	8	.619
Valparaiso		–		–	12	–	8	.600
Mount Union		–		–	7	–	5	.583
Michigan State Normal		–		–	12	–	11	.522
Fairmount		–		–	8	–	8	.500
Ohio		–		–	5	–	6	.455
Indiana State		–		–	4	–	6	.400
Dayton		–		–	5	–	8	.385
Cincinnati		–		–	5	–	9	.357
Beloit		–		–	5	–	10	.333
Bradley		–		–	5	–	10	.333
Butler		–		–	2	–	4	.333
Kent State Normal		–		–	2	–	4	.333
Bowling Green State		–		–	4	–	9	.308
Notre Dame		–		–	5	–	13	.278
Saint Louis		–		–	2	–	11	.154
Xavier		–		–	0	–	3	.000

The 1919–20 Cincinnati Bearcats men's basketball team represented the University of Cincinnati during the 1919–20 college men's basketball season. The head coach was Boyd Chambers, coaching his second season with the Bearcats.

== Schedule ==
Date time, TV	Opponent	Result	Record	Site city, state
January 3	Ohio State	L 13–15	0–1	Schmidlapp Gymnasium; Cincinnati, OH
January 9	Kenyon	L 14–16	0–2	Schmidlapp Gymnasium; Cincinnati, OH
January 17	Kentucky	W 22–19	1–2	Schmidlapp Gymnasium; Cincinnati, OH
January 23	Ohio Northern	W 29–26	2–2	Schmidlapp Gymnasium; Cincinnati, OH
January 24	at Wittenberg	L 27–28	2–3	Springfield, OH
January 31	at Miami (OH)	W 20–16	3–3	Oxford, OH
February 6	Ohio Wesleyan	L 22–31	3–4	Schmidlapp Gymnasium; Cincinnati, OH
February 13	at Ohio	W 31–20	4–4	Ohio Gymnasium; Athens, OH
February 14	at Marietta	L 17–21	4–5	Marietta, OH
February 19	at Indiana	L 12–36	4–6	Men's Gymnasium; Bloomington, IN
February 21	Mount Union	L 18–37	4–7	Schmidlapp Gymnasium; Cincinnati, OH
February 27	Wittenberg	L 19–27	4–8	Schmidlapp Gymnasium; Cincinnati, OH
March 4	Miami (OH)	W 26–17	5–8	Schmidlapp Gymnasium; Cincinnati, OG
March 13	Denison	L 22–26	5–9	Schmidlapp Gymnasium; Cincinnati, OH
*Non-conference game. (#) Tournament seedings in parentheses.
