= Scheumann Stadium =

American football stadium in Muncie, Indiana, US

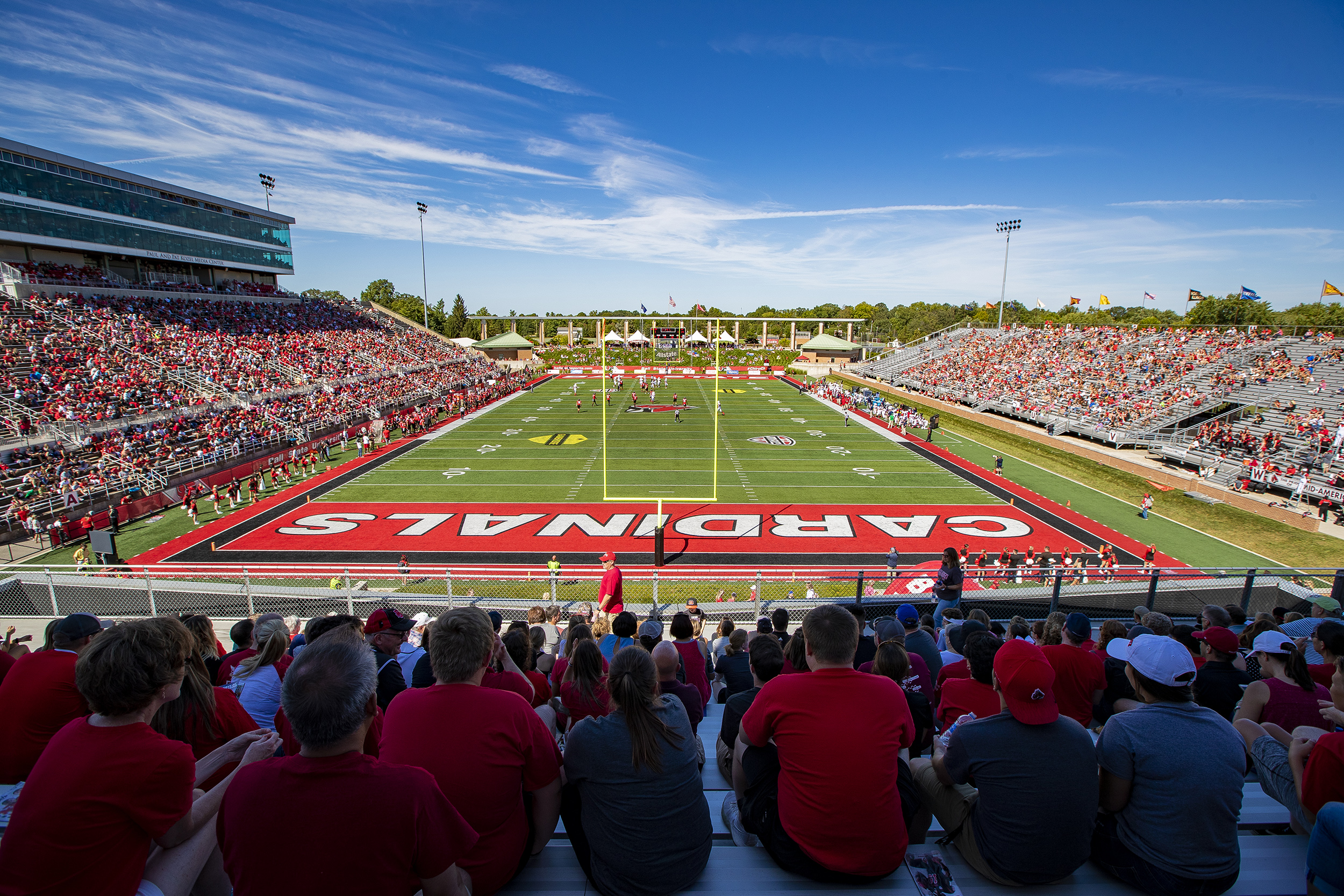
- The stadium in 2019

- Location in Indiana Location in the United States
- Former names: Ball State Stadium (1967–2005)
- Location: Tillotson Avenue, Muncie, Indiana 47306
- Coordinates: 40°12′58″N 85°25′0″W
- Capacity: 16,319 (1967–1997); 21,581 (1998–2006); 22,500 (2007–present)
- Surface: Grass (1967–1996, 2001–2006); AstroTurf (1997–2000); FieldTurf (2007–present)
- Record attendance: 23,861 (November 25, 2008)

Construction
- Opened: September 16, 1967
- Architects: Walter Scholer and Associates

Tenant
- Ball State Cardinals (NCAA) (1967–present)

Scheumann Stadium (officially, the "John B. and June M. Scheumann Stadium"), formerly known as Ball State Stadium, is in Muncie, Indiana. It is primarily used for football, and it is the home field of the Ball State University Cardinals. The stadium opened in 1967, and it has a capacity of 22,500 for football games.

== History ==
Anticipating rapid growth after transitioning from a teacher's college to a comprehensive college, the Ball State University Board of Trustees approved construction of a new athletic stadium one mile north of campus in 1965. The stadium was completed in 1967 with a capacity of 16,000 for football. It replaced the previous stadium closer to campus, on University Avenue across from Ball Memorial Hospital. The site is now used as a soccer field for Burris Laboratory School. A grandstand on the south end of the stadium was added in the 1990s, increasing the capacity to 22,500. In 2005, the stadium was renamed after Ball State alumni and benefactors John B. and June M. Scheumann.

== Today ==
In 2007, a $13 million renovation of the stadium was completed. Planned improvements included new lighting for night games, enclosing the north end zone with lawn seating to create a 22,500-seat horseshoe-shaped venue, new concession stands, a brick facade, a larger press box, and private luxury suites. On August 29, 2013, a new video board was installed.

For a time, notable Ball State alumnus David Letterman jokingly campaigned via his television program to have the stadium named after him. When the stadium was named after the Scheumanns for their donations to the university, Indianapolis mayor Bart Peterson joked that the city would rename the I-465 Beltway as the David Letterman Expressway. Indianapolis was Letterman's childhood home town.

In 2026, the stadium hosted the Monon Bell rivalry game between DePauw and Wabash.

== Records ==
Mean game attendance at the stadium was at the highest in school history in 2008, with an average of about 21,000 visitors per game. This can be attributed to the team's success, as well as recent renovations to the stadium. A school record 10,546 students attended the September 6, 2008 game versus the Navy Midshipmen. The game was televised nationally on ESPN, and Ball State won, 35–23. The all-time record attendance for a game at Scheumann Stadium is 23,861, set on November 25, 2008, when Ball State completed an undefeated regular season by beating MAC rival Western Michigan. The Cardinals won handily, 45–22, pushing their record to 12–0, but they lost to Buffalo in the MAC championship game and to Tulsa in the GMAC Bowl.

== See also ==
- List of NCAA Division I FBS football stadiums
