= J. Norman Elliott =

American sports coach (1894–1959)

Biographical details
- Born: May 12, 1894
- Died: January 21, 1959 (aged 64); Normal, Illinois, U.S.

Playing career

Basketball
- 1913–1916: Illinois Wesleyan

Baseball
- 1917: Bloomington Bloomers
- Position: Pitcher

Coaching career (HC unless noted)

Football
- 1917–1919: Northwestern (freshmen)
- 1930: Illinois Wesleyan (assistant)
- 1931–1934: Illinois Wesleyan

Basketball
- 1917–1918: Northwestern
- 1919–1920: Northwestern

Head coaching record
- Overall: 19–11–4 (football); 10–11 (basketball)

Accomplishments and honors

Championships
- Football; 2 IIAC (1932–1933)

Joseph Norman Elliott (May 12, 1894 – January 21, 1959) was an American college football and college basketball coach, minor league baseball player, and otolaryngologist. Elliott served two seasons as the head basketball coach at Northwestern University, in 1917–18 and 1919–20, compiling a record of 10–11. He also coached freshmen football at Northwestern during that time. Elliott moved to Illinois Wesleyan University in 1930 as an assistant football coach and was the head football coach there from 1931 to 1934, tallying a mark of 19–11–4. Elliott attended Illinois Wesleyan, where he was captain of the basketball team in 1913–14 and 1915–16. He played baseball with the Bloomington Bloomers of the Illinois–Indiana–Iowa League in 1917. Elliott graduated from Northwestern University Medical School—now known as the Feinberg School of Medicine—in 1920. Elliott's sons, Bump Elliott and Pete Elliott, both played college football at the University of Michigan and went on to coaching careers.

== Head coaching record ==
=== Football ===
Year	Team	Overall	Conference	Standing	Bowl/playoffs
Illinois Wesleyan Titans (Illinois Intercollegiate Athletic Conference) (1931–1934)
1931	Illinois Wesleyan	3–5	3–3	T–9th	
1932	Illinois Wesleyan	6–2	6–0	T–1st	
1933	Illinois Wesleyan	6–2–1	4–0–1	1st	
1934	Illinois Wesleyan	4–2–3	3–1–2	6th	
Illinois Wesleyan:		19–11–4	16–4–3		
Total:		19–11–4			
National championship Conference title Conference division title or championship game berth

=== Basketball ===
Record table
Season	Team	Overall	Conference	Standing	Postseason
Northwestern Purple (Big Ten Conference) (1917–1918)
1917–18	Northwestern	7–4	5–3	3rd	
Northwestern Purple (Big Ten Conference) (1919–1920)
1919–20	Northwestern	3–7	2–6	T–7th	
Northwestern:		10–11	7–9		
Total:		10–11			
