= 1919–20 Vanderbilt Commodores men's basketball team =

American college basketball season

1919–20 Vanderbilt Commodores men's basketball

SIAA champion
- Conference: Southern Intercollegiate Athletic Association
- Record: 14–4 (4–0 SIAA)
- Head coach: Guy T. Denton
- Captain: Tom Zerfoss
- Home arena: Old Gym

The 1919–20 Vanderbilt Commodores men's basketball team represented Vanderbilt University in college basketball during the 1919–20 NCAA men's basketball season.

== Roster ==
1919–20 Vanderbilt Commodores men's basketball team
Players
Coaches

| Pos. | # | Name | Height | Weight | Year | Previous school | Hometown |
|---|---|---|---|---|---|---|---|
| C | | Alfred T. Adams | — | 175 lb (79 kg) | Sr | Unknown | Nashville, Tennessee |
| F | | Josh Cody | 6 ft 4 in (1.93 m) | 225 lb (102 kg) | Sr | Bethel | Franklin, Tennessee |
| G | | Johnny Floyd | — | — | Jr | Middle Tennessee State Normal | Murfreesboro, Tennessee |
| G | | Dick Gleaves | — | — | Jr | Hume-Fogg High School | Nashville, Tennessee |
| C | | L. M. Graves | — | — | Jr | Unknown |
| G | | Garland Morrow | — | — | So | Hume-Fogg High School | Nashville, Tennessee |
| G | | Roland Norton | — | — | So | Unknown |
| F | | Tom Zerfoss (C) | — | 155 lb (70 kg) | Sr | Kentucky | Ashland, Kentucky |

Head coach

- Guy T. Denton

Assistant coach(es)

None

Legend

- (C) Team captain
- (S) Suspended
- (I) Ineligible
- (W) Walk-on
- Injured
- Current redshirt

== Schedule and results ==
| Date time, TV | Opponent | Result | Record | Site (attendance) city, state |
|---|---|---|---|---|
| * | Birmingham A. C. | W 30–24 | 1–0 | |
| * | Mobile YMCA | L 33–35 | 1–1 | |
| * | Montgomery YMCA | W 56–28 | 2–1 | |
| * | Chicago YMCA | W 26–14 | 3–1 | |
| * | Boys Club | W 36–6 | 4–1 | |
| * | Memphis YMCA | W 42–25 | 5–1 | |
| 2/4/1920 | Georgia | W 40–18 | 6–1 | Athens, GA |
| * | Nashville YMCA | L 27–29 | 6–2 | |
| | Georgia Tech | W 39–21 | 7–2 | |
| * | Macon YMCA | W 41–35 | 8–2 | |
| * | Boys Club | W 21–14 | 9–2 | |
| * | Chattanooga YMCA | W 45–39 | 10–2 | |
| * | Chattanooga YMCA | W 41–20 | 11–2 | |
| | Centre | W 29–18 | 12–2 | |
| * | Memphis YMCA | L 25–31 | 12–3 | |
| * | Maryville | W 22–10 | 13–3 | |
| | Georgia Tech | W 32–3 | 14–3 | |
| * | Nashville YMCA | L 13–24 | 14–4 | |
*Non-conference game. (#) Tournament seedings in parentheses. All times are in Central Time.
