= Tom Zerfoss =

American football and basketball player and coach (1895–1988)

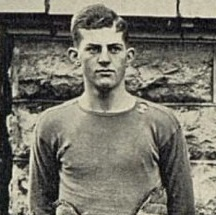
- Zerfoss in football uniform

Biographical details
- Born: June 15, 1895; Ashland, Kentucky, U.S.
- Died: August 5, 1988 (aged 93); Nashville, Tennessee, U.S.

Playing career

Football
- 1915–1919: Vanderbilt

Basketball
- 1913–1914: Kentucky
- 1915–1920: Vanderbilt
- Positions: End, halfback (football); Forward, center (basketball)

Coaching career (HC unless noted)

Football
- 1922–1924: Vanderbilt (assistant)

Administrative career (AD unless noted)
- 1940–1944: Vanderbilt

Accomplishments and honors

Championships
- Basketball; 2 SIAA (1914, 1920)

Awards
- Football; All-Southern (1919)

Thomas Bowman Zerfoss (June 15, 1895 – August 5, 1988) was an American football and basketball player and coach. He played for both the Kentucky Wildcats of the University of Kentucky and the Vanderbilt Commodores of Vanderbilt University. He coached the latter's freshman football team and served as an assistant under head coach Dan McGugin. Zerfoss was selected as an All-Southern football player in 1919 by Charles A. Reinhart, sporting editor for the Louisville Courier-Journal, and J. L. Ray, sporting editor for the Nashville Tennessean. Zerfoss also was captain of the 1919–20 SIAA champion basketball team which went 14–4. As a player, he weighed 155 pounds.

He graduated from Vanderbilt with an M. D. The Zerfoss Student Health Center at Vanderbilt bears his name. A plaque upon it reads "Named in honor of Thomas Bowman Zerfoss Sr., M.D. ... physician, guide, philosopher and friend to Vanderbilt students for more than 40 years." Zerfoss was Vanderbilt's athletic director from 1940 to 1944. During the nationwide anti-tuberculosis campaign, Vanderbilt issued a mandatory tuberculosis screening of all students in 1948. Students complied by making appointments for chest X-rays with Zerfoss.

It was Zerfoss who got tennis great Joe C. Davis, Jr. to come to Vanderbilt.
