= 1919–20 Colgate men's basketball team =

American college basketball season

1919–20 Colgate Raiders men's basketball
- Conference: Independent
- Record: 16–7
- Head coach: William Reid (1st season)
- Captain: Oscar Anderson
- Home arena: none

1919–20 NCAA men's basketball northeastern independents standings
	Conf.				Overall
Team	W		L	PCT	W		L	PCT
New York University		–		–	16	–	1	.941
Penn State		–		–	12	–	1	.923
Buffalo		–		–	9	–	1	.900
WPI		–		–	14	–	2	.875
Army		–		–	12	–	2	.857
Syracuse		–		–	15	–	3	.833
CCNY		–		–	13	–	3	.813
Stevens Institute		–		–	12	–	3	.800
Seton Hall		–		–	10	–	3	.769
Niagara		–		–	6	–	2	.750
Rutgers		–		–	11	–	4	.733
Canisius		–		–	10	–	4	.714
Bucknell		–		–	14	–	6	.700
Colgate		–		–	16	–	7	.696
Gettysburg		–		–	6	–	3	.667
Grove City		–		–	13	–	7	.650
Springfield (Mass.)		–		–	8	–	5	.615
Pittsburgh		–		–	9	–	6	.600
St. Joseph's		–		–	9	–	6	.600
Connecticut		–		–	7	–	5	.583
Fordham		–		–	12	–	9	.571
Temple		–		–	9	–	7	.563
Geneva		–		–	10	–	9	.526
Lehigh		–		–	5	–	7	.417
St. John's (N.Y.)		–		–	9	–	14	.391
Duquesne		–		–	6	–	10	.375
St. Bonaventure		–		–	6	–	10	.375
Brown		–		–	5	–	10	.333
Lafayette		–		–	3	–	7	.300
Rhode Island State		–		–	3	–	8	.273
Manhattan		–		–	1	–	8	.111
Boston University		–		–	0	–	6	.000

The 1919–20 Colgate Raiders men's basketball team represented Colgate University during the 1919–20 college men's basketball season. The head coach was William Reid, coaching the Raiders in his first season. The team had finished with a final record of 16–7. The team captain was Oscar Anderson.

== Schedule ==
Date time, TV	Opponent	Result	Record	Site city, state
*	Clarkson	W 43–28	1–0	Hamilton, NY
*	at Cornell	L 17–27	1–1	Hamilton, NY
*	at Union	W 26–17	2–1	
*	Bucknell	W 56–38	3–1	
*	at New York Univ.	L 26–40	3–2	Utica, NY
*	at Hamilton	W 34–23	4–2	Williamstown, MA
*	at Albany State	W 48–16	5–2	
*	at Wesleyan	W 41–29	6–2	
*	Dartmouth	W 40–28	7–2	Hamilton, NY
*	Rochester	W 40–20	8–2	Hamilton, NY
*	Buffalo	L 24–26	8–3	Erie, PA
*	at Buffalo	L 15–23	8–4	Buffalo, NY
*	Albany State	W 67–29	9–4	
*	at St. John's	W 57–19	10–4	
*	at Crescent A.C.	W 26–19	11–4	Hamilton, NY
*	at New York Univ.	L 29–35	11–5	
*	Syracuse	L 26–34	11–6	Hamilton, NY
*	at Carnegie Tech	W 30–27	12–6	
*	at Pittsburgh	W 35–25	13–6	
*	at Washington-Jefferson	W 30–28	14–6	
*	at Rochester	W 38–26	15–6	Rochester, NY
*	at Syracuse	L 27–31	15–7	Archbold Gymnasium; Syracuse, NY
*	at RPI	W 24–20	16–7	
*Non-conference game. (#) Tournament seedings in parentheses.
