= 1919–20 Niagara Purple Eagles men's basketball team =

American college basketball season

1919–20 Niagara Purple Eagles men's basketball
- Conference: Independent
- Record: 6–2
- Head coach: John Blake (1st season)

1919–20 NCAA men's basketball northeastern independents standings
	Conf.				Overall
Team	W		L	PCT	W		L	PCT
New York University		–		–	16	–	1	.941
Penn State		–		–	12	–	1	.923
Buffalo		–		–	9	–	1	.900
WPI		–		–	14	–	2	.875
Army		–		–	12	–	2	.857
Syracuse		–		–	15	–	3	.833
CCNY		–		–	13	–	3	.813
Stevens Institute		–		–	12	–	3	.800
Seton Hall		–		–	10	–	3	.769
Niagara		–		–	6	–	2	.750
Rutgers		–		–	11	–	4	.733
Canisius		–		–	10	–	4	.714
Bucknell		–		–	14	–	6	.700
Colgate		–		–	16	–	7	.696
Gettysburg		–		–	6	–	3	.667
Grove City		–		–	13	–	7	.650
Springfield (Mass.)		–		–	8	–	5	.615
Pittsburgh		–		–	9	–	6	.600
St. Joseph's		–		–	9	–	6	.600
Connecticut		–		–	7	–	5	.583
Fordham		–		–	12	–	9	.571
Temple		–		–	9	–	7	.563
Geneva		–		–	10	–	9	.526
Lehigh		–		–	5	–	7	.417
St. John's (N.Y.)		–		–	9	–	14	.391
Duquesne		–		–	6	–	10	.375
St. Bonaventure		–		–	6	–	10	.375
Brown		–		–	5	–	10	.333
Lafayette		–		–	3	–	7	.300
Rhode Island State		–		–	3	–	8	.273
Manhattan		–		–	1	–	8	.111
Boston University		–		–	0	–	6	.000

The 1919–20 Niagara Purple Eagles men's basketball team represented Niagara University during the 1919–20 NCAA college men's basketball season. The head coach was John Blake, coaching his first season with the Purple Eagles.

== Schedule ==
Date time, TV	Opponent	Result	Record	Site city, state
	Niagalla	W 35–23	1–0	Lewiston, NY
	Cornell	L 22–33	1–1	Lewiston, NY
	Hobart	W 42–21	2–1	Lewiston, NY
	St. Ignatius	W 29–05	3–1	Lewiston, NY
2/05/1920	at St. John's	W 25–13	4–1	Queens, NY
2/13/1920	at Canisius	W 27–11	5–1	Buffalo, NY
	Buffalo	L 19–31	5–2	Lewiston, NY
3/14/1920	Canisius	W 28–21	6–2	Lewiston, NY
*Non-conference game. (#) Tournament seedings in parentheses.
