= 1919–20 Buffalo Bisons men's basketball team =

American college basketball season

1919–20 Buffalo Bisons men's basketball
- Conference: Independent
- Record: 9–1
- Head coach: Art Powell (5th season)

1919–20 NCAA men's basketball northeastern independents standings
	Conf.				Overall
Team	W		L	PCT	W		L	PCT
New York University		–		–	16	–	1	.941
Penn State		–		–	12	–	1	.923
Buffalo		–		–	9	–	1	.900
WPI		–		–	14	–	2	.875
Army		–		–	12	–	2	.857
Syracuse		–		–	15	–	3	.833
CCNY		–		–	13	–	3	.813
Stevens Institute		–		–	12	–	3	.800
Seton Hall		–		–	10	–	3	.769
Niagara		–		–	6	–	2	.750
Rutgers		–		–	11	–	4	.733
Canisius		–		–	10	–	4	.714
Bucknell		–		–	14	–	6	.700
Colgate		–		–	16	–	7	.696
Gettysburg		–		–	6	–	3	.667
Grove City		–		–	13	–	7	.650
Springfield (Mass.)		–		–	8	–	5	.615
Pittsburgh		–		–	9	–	6	.600
St. Joseph's		–		–	9	–	6	.600
Connecticut		–		–	7	–	5	.583
Fordham		–		–	12	–	9	.571
Temple		–		–	9	–	7	.563
Geneva		–		–	10	–	9	.526
Lehigh		–		–	5	–	7	.417
St. John's (N.Y.)		–		–	9	–	14	.391
Duquesne		–		–	6	–	10	.375
St. Bonaventure		–		–	6	–	10	.375
Brown		–		–	5	–	10	.333
Lafayette		–		–	3	–	7	.300
Rhode Island State		–		–	3	–	8	.273
Manhattan		–		–	1	–	8	.111
Boston University		–		–	0	–	6	.000

The 1919–20 Buffalo Bisons men's basketball team represented the University of Buffalo during the 1919–20 NCAA college men's basketball season. The head coach was Art Powell, coaching his fifth season with the Bisons.

== Schedule ==
Date time, TV	Opponent	Result	Record	Site city, state
	Toronto	W 49–18	1–0	Buffalo, NY
	Detroit	W 28–22	2–0	Buffalo, NY
	Cornell	L 16–18	2–1	Buffalo, NY
	Westminster	W 36–23	3–1	Buffalo, NY
	at Colgate	W 26–24	4–1	Buffalo, NY
	Colgate	W 23–15	5–1	Buffalo, NY
	Hobart	W 68–10	6–1	Buffalo, NY
	Elwoods	W 43–30	7–1	Buffalo, NY
	Geneva	W 53–12	8–1	Buffalo, NY
	Niagara	W 31–19	9–1	Buffalo, NY
*Non-conference game. (#) Tournament seedings in parentheses.
