= 1919–20 Connecticut Aggies men's basketball team =

American college basketball season

1919–20 Connecticut Aggies men's basketball
- Conference: Athletic League of New England State Colleges
- Record: 7–5 (1–3 ALNESC)
- Head coach: M.R. Swartz (1st season)
- Home arena: Hawley Armory

1919–20 NCAA men's basketball northeastern independents standings
	Conf.				Overall
Team	W		L	PCT	W		L	PCT
New York University		–		–	16	–	1	.941
Penn State		–		–	12	–	1	.923
Buffalo		–		–	9	–	1	.900
WPI		–		–	14	–	2	.875
Army		–		–	12	–	2	.857
Syracuse		–		–	15	–	3	.833
CCNY		–		–	13	–	3	.813
Stevens Institute		–		–	12	–	3	.800
Seton Hall		–		–	10	–	3	.769
Niagara		–		–	6	–	2	.750
Rutgers		–		–	11	–	4	.733
Canisius		–		–	10	–	4	.714
Bucknell		–		–	14	–	6	.700
Colgate		–		–	16	–	7	.696
Gettysburg		–		–	6	–	3	.667
Grove City		–		–	13	–	7	.650
Springfield (Mass.)		–		–	8	–	5	.615
Pittsburgh		–		–	9	–	6	.600
St. Joseph's		–		–	9	–	6	.600
Connecticut		–		–	7	–	5	.583
Fordham		–		–	12	–	9	.571
Temple		–		–	9	–	7	.563
Geneva		–		–	10	–	9	.526
Lehigh		–		–	5	–	7	.417
St. John's (N.Y.)		–		–	9	–	14	.391
Duquesne		–		–	6	–	10	.375
St. Bonaventure		–		–	6	–	10	.375
Brown		–		–	5	–	10	.333
Lafayette		–		–	3	–	7	.300
Rhode Island State		–		–	3	–	8	.273
Manhattan		–		–	1	–	8	.111
Boston University		–		–	0	–	6	.000

The 1919–20 Connecticut Aggies men's basketball team represented Connecticut Agricultural College, now the University of Connecticut, in the 1919–20 collegiate men's basketball season. The Aggies completed the season with a 7–5 overall record. The Aggies were members of the Athletic League of New England State Colleges, where they ended the season with a 1–3 record. The Aggies played their home games at Hawley Armory in Storrs, Connecticut, and were led by first-year head coach M.R. Swartz.

== Schedule ==
Date time, TV	Rank^{#}	Opponent^{#}	Result	Record	Site (attendance) city, state
Regular Season
*		Wesleyan	L 31–43	0–1	
*		Middlebury	W 52–48	1–1	
		Massachusetts	W 28–19	2–1 (1–0)	
*		Trinity	W 25–17	3–1	
*		Boston College	W 51–13	4–1	
		Rhode Island	L 23–29	4–2 (1–1)	
*		Wentworth Institute	W 71–6	5–2	
		Massachusetts	L 22–27	5–3 (1–2)	
*		Trinity	W 24–17	6–3	
*		Clark	W 33–26	7–3	
		New Hampshire	L 20–39	7–4 (1–3)	
2/21/1920*		Worcester Polytechnic Institute	L 17–23	7–5	Alumni Gym; Worcester, MA
*Non-conference game. ^{#}Rankings from AP Poll. (#) Tournament seedings in parentheses. All times are in Eastern Time.

Schedule Source:
