= 1919–20 Duquesne Dukes men's basketball team =

American college basketball season

1919–20 Duquesne Dukes men's basketball
- Conference: Independent
- Record: 6–10
- Head coach: Eugene McGuigan (7th season)
- Home arena: Duquesne Garden

1919–20 NCAA men's basketball northeastern independents standings
	Conf.				Overall
Team	W		L	PCT	W		L	PCT
New York University		–		–	16	–	1	.941
Penn State		–		–	12	–	1	.923
Buffalo		–		–	9	–	1	.900
WPI		–		–	14	–	2	.875
Army		–		–	12	–	2	.857
Syracuse		–		–	15	–	3	.833
CCNY		–		–	13	–	3	.813
Stevens Institute		–		–	12	–	3	.800
Seton Hall		–		–	10	–	3	.769
Niagara		–		–	6	–	2	.750
Rutgers		–		–	11	–	4	.733
Canisius		–		–	10	–	4	.714
Bucknell		–		–	14	–	6	.700
Colgate		–		–	16	–	7	.696
Gettysburg		–		–	6	–	3	.667
Grove City		–		–	13	–	7	.650
Springfield (Mass.)		–		–	8	–	5	.615
Pittsburgh		–		–	9	–	6	.600
St. Joseph's		–		–	9	–	6	.600
Connecticut		–		–	7	–	5	.583
Fordham		–		–	12	–	9	.571
Temple		–		–	9	–	7	.563
Geneva		–		–	10	–	9	.526
Lehigh		–		–	5	–	7	.417
St. John's (N.Y.)		–		–	9	–	14	.391
Duquesne		–		–	6	–	10	.375
St. Bonaventure		–		–	6	–	10	.375
Brown		–		–	5	–	10	.333
Lafayette		–		–	3	–	7	.300
Rhode Island State		–		–	3	–	8	.273
Manhattan		–		–	1	–	8	.111
Boston University		–		–	0	–	6	.000

The 1919–20 Duquesne Dukes men's basketball team represented Duquesne University during the 1919–20 college men's basketball season. The head coach was Eugene McGuigan coaching the Dukes in his seventh year. The team finished the season with an overall record of 6–10.

== Schedule ==
Date time, TV	Opponent	Result	Record	Site city, state
January 10*	at Wash. & Jeff.	L 26–50	0–1	Washington, PA
January 12*	Franklin College	W 39–31	1–1	Duquesne Garden; Pittsburgh, PA
January 17*	Westinghouse Club	L 31–43	1–2	Duquesne Garden; Pittsburgh, PA
January 23*	at Grove City	L 16–40	1–3	Pittsburgh, PA
January 24*	New Castle AC	L 30–42	1–4	Duquesne Garden; Pittsburgh, PA
January 31*	Avalon Club	W 40–35	2–4	Duquesne Garden; Pittsburgh, PA
February 3*	Coffey Club	L 30–32	2–5	Duquesne Garden; Pittsburgh, PA
February 11*	at Carnegie Tech	L 36–40	2–6	Pittsburgh, PA
February 13*	St. Bonaventure	W 41–27	3–6	Duquesne Garden; Pittsburgh, PA
February 17*	Ornsby Club	L 41–63	3–7	Duquesne Garden; Pittsburgh, PA
February 20*	Muskingham	L 36–39	3–8	Duquesne Garden; Pittsburgh, PA
February 21*	Heinz House	W 46–43	4–8	Duquesne Garden; Pittsburgh, PA
February 28*	W. Virginia Wesleyan	L 29–34	4–9	Duquesne Garden; Pittsburgh, PA
March 9*	Creighton	L 27–31	4–10	Duquesne Garden; Pittsburgh, PA
March 11*	Juniata	W 45–29	5–10	Duquesne Garden; Pittsburgh, PA
March 15*	Waynesburg	W 49–35	6–10	Duquesne Garden; Pittsburgh, PA
*Non-conference game. (#) Tournament seedings in parentheses.
