= 1919–20 Washington State Cougars men's basketball team =

American college basketball season

1919–20 Washington State Cougars men's basketball
- Conference: Pacific Coast Conference
- Record: 10–11 (6–7 PCC)
- Head coach: Fred Bohler (12th season)

1919–20 Pacific Coast Conference men's basketball standings
	Conf.				Overall
Team	W		L	PCT	W		L	PCT
Stanford	9	–	1	.900	8	–	3	.727
California	5	–	5	.500	8	–	5	.615
Washington State	6	–	7	.462	10	–	11	.476
Oregon Agricultural	5	–	7	.417	7	–	12	.368
Washington	5	–	7	.417	7	–	8	.467
Oregon	5	–	8	.385	8	–	9	.471
As of 1920

The 1919–20 Washington State Cougars men's basketball team represented Washington State College for the 1919–20 college basketball season. Led by twelfth-year head coach Fred Bohler, the Cougars were members of the Pacific Coast Conference and played their home games on campus in Pullman, Washington.

The Cougars were 10–11 overall in the regular season and 6–7 in conference play, third in the standings.
