= 1920–21 Navy Midshipmen men's basketball team =

American college basketball season

1920–21 Navy Midshipmen men's basketball
- Conference: Independent
- Record: 18–1
- Head coach: Billy Lush (3rd season)
- Home arena: Dahlgren Hall

The 1920–21 Navy Midshipmen men's basketball team represented the United States Naval Academy in intercollegiate basketball during the 1920–21 season. The head coach was Billy Lush, coaching his third season with the Midshipmen.

== Schedule ==
Date time, TV	Opponent	Result	Record	Site city, state
Dec. 4, 1920* no, no	Delaware	W 67–04	1–0	Dahlgren Hall; Annapolis, MD
Dec. 15, 1920*	Washington MD.	W 38–06	2–0	Dahlgren Hall; Annapolis, MD
Dec. 22, 1920* no, no	St. Joseph's	W 39–08	3–0	Dahlgren Hall; Annapolis, MD
Dec. 18, 1920 no, no	Lehigh	W 28–14	4–0	Dahlgren Hall; Annapolis, MD
Jan. 1, 1921 no, no	Union	W 23–19	5–0	Dahlgren Hall; Annapolis, MD
Jan. 8, 1921 no, no	Lafayette	W 27–10	6–0	Dahlgren Hall; Annapolis, MD
Jan. 12, 1921 no, no	Moravian	W 35–15	7–0	Annapolis, MD
Jan. 15, 1921 no, no	Rutgers	W 38–13	8–0	Dahlgren Hall; Annapolis, MD
Jan. 19, 1921	Villanova	W 47–19	9–0	Dahlgren Hall; Annapolis, MD
Jan. 22, 1921 no, no	Camp Humphries	W 26–12	10–0	Dahlgren Hall; Annapolis, MD
Jan. 26, 1921 no, no	Brooklyn Poly. Inst.	W 25–14	11–0	Dahlgren Hall; Annapolis, MD
Jan. 29, 1920 no, no	Delaware	L 19–21	11–1	Dahlgren Hall; Annapolis, MD
Feb. 2, 1920 no, no	Roanoke	W 38–09	12–1	Dahlgren Hall; Annapolis, MD
Feb. 5, 1921 no, no	Virginia	W 30–17	13–1	Dahlgren Hall; Annapolis, MD
Feb. 9, 1921 no, no	North Carolina	W 54–24	14–1	Dahlgren Hall; Annapolis, MD
	Baltimore Collegians	W 37–31	15–1	Dahlgren Hall; Annapolis, MD
Feb. 19, 1921 no, no	Marietta	W 45–16	16–1	Dahlgren Hall; Annapolis, MD
Feb. 19, 1921 no, no	George Washington	W 43–09	17–1	Dahlgren Hall; Annapolis, MD
Feb. 26, 1921 no, no	Army	W 45–29	18–1	Dahlgren Hall; Annapolis, MD
*Non-conference game. (#) Tournament seedings in parentheses.
