= 1919–20 William & Mary Indians men's basketball team =

American college basketball season

1919–20 William & Mary Indians men's basketball
- Conference: Independent
- Record: 5–7
- Head coach: James G. Driver (1st season)

The 1919–20 William & Mary Indians men's basketball team represented the College of William & Mary in intercollegiate basketball during the 1919–20 season. Under the first year of head coach James G. Driver (who concurrently served as head football coach), the team finished the season with a 5–7 record. This was the 15th season of the collegiate basketball program at William & Mary, whose nickname is now the Tribe.

== Schedule ==
| Date time, TV | Rank^{#} | Opponent^{#} | Result | Record | Site city, state |
Regular season
| * | | Medical College of Virginia | L 13–35 | 0–1 | Williamsburg, VA |
| * | | Randolph–Macon | L 28–50 | 0–2 | Williamsburg, VA |
| 2/11/1919* | | at Richmond | W 22–20 | 1–2 | Richmond, VA |
| * | | Hampden–Sydney | L 16–24 | 1–3 | Williamsburg, VA |
| * | | Hampden–Sydney | W 32–23 | 2–3 | Williamsburg, VA |
| 2/21/1919* | | Richmond | L 39–42 ^{OT} | 2–4 | Williamsburg, VA |
| * | | Randolph–Macon | L 14–41 | 2–5 | Williamsburg, VA |
| * | | Church Hill A.C. | L 24–49 | 2–6 | Williamsburg, VA |
| * | | Medical College of Virginia | L 19–52 | 2–7 | Williamsburg, VA |
| * | | Union Theological Seminary | W 28–27 | 3–7 | Williamsburg, VA |
| * | | Fort Monroe | W 37–27 | 4–7 | Williamsburg, VA |
| * | | Union Theological Seminary | W 47–20 | 5–7 | Williamsburg, VA |
*Non-conference game. ^{#}Rankings from AP Poll. (#) Tournament seedings in parentheses.
