= Lacey Eastburn =

University president (1880–1957)

Lacey Arnold Eastburn (May 19, 1880 – October 31, 1957) was the tenth president of Arizona State College at Flagstaff, now Northern Arizona University, from 1947 to 1957.

== Early life ==
Eastburn was raised on farms in Iowa and Missouri. He was only able to attend school for four or five months per year so he did not finish eighth grade until he was nineteen years old. He obtained a license to teach in Missouri but left for Arizona to try his luck as a miner. He would return to Missouri to oversee the sale of his father's farm after his father suffered a stroke.

While in Missouri he obtained his bachelor's degree from Southwest Missouri Teacher's College in three years before earning his master's degree from Drury University in 1917. With the start of World War I he joined the U.S. Army Air Service as a lieutenant. A tonsillectomy prevented him from being deployed to Europe.

== Professional life ==
After the war, both he and his wife, Viola B. Cox Eastburn, were hired as teachers at Northern Arizona Normal School. While there he was the basketball coach for the 1920–21 season with a record of 16–9.

In 1921, the couple was hired to teach at Phoenix Junior College. While they were there, Eastburn completed graduate work at the University of Arizona, the University of California at Berkeley, and Stanford University which led to a doctorate degree.

== Northern Arizona University ==
In 1947, Eastburn became president of Arizona State College at Flagstaff (ASC). Soon after, the North Central Association suspended ASC's accreditation based on deficiencies across many areas. Eastburn addressed the problems by building a library and recruiting better faculty members. He also set about a building program with the support of the state legislature and the Board of Regents. The next year North Central modified its ruling and then fully restore ASC's accreditation in 1951.

The restoration of accreditation led to national fraternities coming to campus. Sigma Pi was the first fraternity on campus and Eastburn was initiated into the organization at its local chapter's chartering.

In September 1957 he took a leave of absence on the advice of his doctor. He died the next month.

After his death an education scholarship was named for him as was the College of Education Building.

He was a member of the Kiwanis.

== Head coaching record ==
=== Football ===
Year	Team	Overall	Conference	Standing	Bowl/playoffs
Northern Arizona Lumberjacks (Independent) (1920)
1920	Northern Arizona	3–2			
Northern Arizona:		3–2			
Total:		3–2			
