= 1919–20 Tennessee Volunteers basketball team =

American college basketball season

1919–20 Tennessee Volunteers basketball
- Conference: Independent
- Record: 11–3
- Head coach: John R. Bender (1st season)
- Captain: Henry P. "Peg" Bell
- Home arena: Downtown YMCA

The 1919–20 Tennessee Volunteers basketball team represented the University of Tennessee during the 1919–20 college men's basketball season. The head coach was John R. Bender coaching the team in his first season. The Volunteers team captain was "Peg" Bell.

The 1920 Volunteer team was one of five colleges and universities invited to take place in the national AAU tournament in March of that year, marking the first postseason appearance for the school. They lost their first-round game to the hosting Atlanta Athletic Club.

== Schedule ==
Date time, TV	Opponent	Result	Record	Site city, state
January 17, 1920*	Jellico YMCA	W 49–19	1–0	Downtown YMCA; Knoxville, TN
January 19, 1920*	Tusculum	W 41–35	2–0	Downtown YMCA; Knoxville, TN
January 23, 1920*	Maryville	W 43–23	3–0	Downtown YMCA; Knoxville, TN
January 30, 1920*	at Maryville	L 11–23	3–1	Maryville, TN
February 2, 1920*	at Jellico YMCA	W 27–12	4–1	Jellico, TN
February 3, 1920*	at Centre	W 2–0	5–1	Danville, KY
February 4, 1920*	at Georgetown (KY)	W 54–14	6–1	Georgetown, KY
February 5, 1920*	at Kentucky	W 29–24	7–1	Lexington, KY
February 6, 1920*	at Transylvania	W 38–15	8–1	Lexington, KY
February 7, 1920*	at Kentucky	W 27–26	9–1	Lexington, KY
February 25, 1920*	Knoxville YMCA	W 47–18	10–1	Downtown YMCA; Knoxville, TN
February 27, 1920*	Kentucky	W 28–25	11–1	Downtown YMCA; Knoxville, TN
February 28, 1920*	Kentucky	L 25–36	11–2	Downtown YMCA; Knoxville, TN
AAU National Championship
March 10, 1920*	vs. Atlanta Athletic Club	L 26–58	11–3	Atlanta Auditorium and Armory; Atlanta, GA
*Non-conference game. (#) Tournament seedings in parentheses.
