= Guy Peverly =

American football coach

Coaching career (HC unless noted)
- 1902: Fairmount

Head coaching record
- Overall: 4–3–1

Guy Peverly was an American college football coach. He was the third head football coach at Fairmount College—now known as Wichita State University—in Wichita, Kansas, serving for one season, in 1902, and compiling a record of 4–3–1.

== Head coaching record ==
Year	Team	Overall	Conference	Standing	Bowl/playoffs
Fairmount Wheatshockers (Independent) (1902)
1902	Fairmount	4–3–1			
Fairmount:		4–3–1			
Total:		4–3–1			
