= 1919–20 Trinity Blue and White men's basketball team =

American college basketball season

1919–20 Trinity Blue and White men's basketball
- Conference: Independent
- Record: 10–4
- Head coach: Walter Rothensies (1st season)
- Captain: Loyd Hathaway
- Home arena: The Ark

The 1919–20 Trinity Blue and White's basketball team represented Trinity College (later renamed Duke University) during the 1919–20 men's college basketball season. The head coach was Walter Rothensies, coaching his first season with Trinity. The team finished with an overall record of 10–4.

== Schedule ==
Date time, TV	Opponent	Result	Record	Site city, state
*	Durham YMCA	T 0–0	1–0	
*	Durham YMCA	T 0–0	1–1	
*	Elon	T 0–0	3–0	
*	Guilford	T 0–0	4–0	
*	Guilford	T 0–0	5–0	
*	N.C. State	W 28–22	6–0	The Ark; Durham, NC
*	at Virginia	L 20–28	6–1	Charlottesville, VA
*	at N.C. State	W 25–24	7–1	Raleigh, NC
*	Unknown	T 0–0	7–2	
*	Unknown	T 0–0	7–3	
*	Unknown	T 0–0	8–3	
*	Unknown	T 0–0	9–3	
1/24/1920*	at North Carolina	L 25–36	9–4	Chapel Hill, NC
3/1/1920*	North Carolina	W 19–18	10–4	The Ark; Durham, NC
*Non-conference game. (#) Tournament seedings in parentheses.
