= 1919–20 Navy Midshipmen men's basketball team =

American college basketball season

1919–20 Navy Midshipmen men's basketball
- Conference: Independent
- Record: 14–3
- Head coach: Billy Lush (2nd season)
- Home arena: Dahlgren Hall

The 1919–20 Navy Midshipmen men's basketball team represented the United States Naval Academy in intercollegiate basketball during the 1919–20 season. The head coach was Billy Lush, coaching his second season with the Midshipmen.

== Schedule ==
Date time, TV	Opponent	Result	Record	Site city, state
Dec. 17, 1919* no, no	Delaware	L 19–34	0–1	Dahlgren Hall; Annapolis, MD
*	Washington MD.	W 38–10	1–1	Dahlgren Hall; Annapolis, MD
Dec. 20, 1920* no, no	Penn	L 17–30	1–2	Philadelphia, PA
Dec. 31, 1919	Johns Hopkins	L 18–20	4–0	Dahlgren Hall; Annapolis, MD
Jan. 3, 1920 no, no	Stevens Technical Inst.	W 37–34	2–3	Dahlgren Hall; Annapolis, MD
Jan. 10, 1920 no, no	Lafayette	W 30–23	3–3	Dahlgren Hall; Annapolis, MD
Jan. 14, 1920 no, no	Catholic	W 29–15	4–3	Annapolis, MD
Jan. 21, 1920 no, no	Virginia	W 34–15	5–3	Dahlgren Hall; Annapolis, MD
	Johns Hopkins	W 37–20	6–3	Dahlgren Hall; Annapolis, MD
	George Washington	W 40–13	7–3	Dahlgren Hall; Annapolis, MD
	St. Joseph's	W 40–15	8–3	Dahlgren Hall; Annapolis, MD
Jan. 31, 1920 no, no	Bucknell	W 15–13	9–3	Dahlgren Hall; Annapolis, MD
Feb. 4, 1920 no, no	West Virginia Wesleyan	W 37–23	10–3	Dahlgren Hall; Annapolis, MD
Feb. 7, 1920 no, no	Camp Humphries	W 33–11	11–3	Dahlgren Hall; Annapolis, MD
Feb. 11, 1920 no, no	North Carolina	W 37–24	12–3	Dahlgren Hall; Annapolis, MD
	Mount St. Mary's	W 31–15	13–3	Dahlgren Hall; Annapolis, MD
Feb. 1, 1920 no, no	Army	W 24–18	14–3	Dahlgren Hall; Annapolis, MD
*Non-conference game. (#) Tournament seedings in parentheses.
