= Kenneth Cassidy =

American football and basketball coach

Biographical details
- Born: September 14, 1893; Fort Scott, Kansas, U.S.
- Died: April 2, 1963 (aged 69); Escondido, California, U.S.
- Education: Fairmount College; Ottawa University

Coaching career (HC unless noted)

Football
- 1919: Fairmount

Basketball
- 1919–1920: Fairmount

Head coaching record
- Overall: 2–6–2 (football); 8–8 (basketball)

Henry Kenneth Cassidy (September 14, 1893 – April 2, 1963) was an American college football and college basketball coach. He served as the 11th head football at Fairmount College—now known as Wichita State University—in Wichita, Kansas and he that position for the 1919 season, comping a record of 2–6–2. Cassidy was also the head basketball coach at Fairmount for one season, in 1919–20, tallying a mark of 8–8.

Cassidy was an alumnus of Fairmount College and Ottawa University. He served in France as a United States Army infantry officer during World War I. Cassidy died on April 2, 1963, at Palomar Memorial Hospital California in Escondido, California.

== Head coaching record ==
=== Football ===
Year	Team	Overall	Conference	Standing	Bowl/playoffs
Fairmount Wheatshockers (Independent) (1919)
1919	Fairmount	2–6–2	2–6–2	13th	
Fairmount:		2–6–2	2–6–2		
Total:		2–6–2			
