= DePauw Tigers =

Athletic teams that represent DePauw University

- University: DePauw University
- Conference: North Coast Athletic Conference
- NCAA: Division III
- Athletic director: Stevie Baker-Watson
- Location: Greencastle, Indiana
- Varsity teams: 23
- Football stadium: Blackstock Stadium
- Basketball arena: Neal Fieldhouse
- Baseball stadium: Walker Field
- Softball stadium: Softball Field
- Soccer stadium: Reavis Stadium
- Other venues: Blackstock Courts; Erdmann Natatorium; Indoor Tennis and Track Center
- Mascot: Tyler the Tiger
- Nickname: Tigers
- Fight song: "Here's to DePauw"
- Colors: Black and old gold
- Website: depauwtigers.com
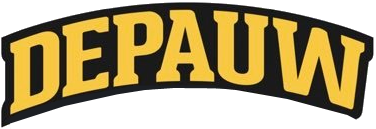

The DePauw Tigers are the athletic teams that represent DePauw University, a small liberal arts school in Greencastle, Indiana. The university's teams play in the NCAA Division III and currently belong to the North Coast Athletic Conference.

DePauw has a passionate and long-standing rivalry with nearby Wabash College, culminating each football season with the Monon Bell game, which is the sixth most-played Division III rivalry and the 12th-most played in college football. To date, there have been 116 total games played between the two teams, resulting in a lead for Wabash at 60–53–9.

In 1933, head coach Ray "Gaumey" Neal led the DePauw Tigers football team to an unbeaten, untied, and unscored opening season. The Tigers compiled a 7–0–0 record and outscored their opponents 136–0. Neal nearly duplicated this feat in 1943, but DePauw, 5–0–1, finished the season with one scoreless tie and six points allowed in a different game. The only points surrendered that season was in a 39–6 victory over Indiana State and the only non-win was a 0–0 tie against Oberlin. The Tigers outscored their opponents, 206–6.

DePauw had been a member of the Southern Collegiate Athletic Conference from 1997 to 2011 and won numerous conference championships, most notably in women's basketball, where the school is a Division III power. DePauw's program had also won the conference's overall "President's Trophy" seven times in that span, including six consecutive President's Trophies from 2005 to 2006 to 2010–11. In 2007, the Tigers defeated Washington University in St. Louis to win the Division III title in women's basketball. The women's softball team won the regional title, advancing to the Division III College World Series for the first time in school history. Most notably in 2021, the DePauw softball team finished third at the NCAA Division III Softball Championship.

== Varsity sports ==
Men's sports	Women's sports
Baseball	Basketball
Basketball	Cross country
Cross country	Field hockey
Football	Golf
Golf	Lacrosse
Lacrosse	Soccer
Swimming	Softball
Tennis	Swimming
Track and field	Tennis
	Track and field
	Volleyball

=== Basketball ===
The DePauw University women's basketball team won the Division III National Championship in 2007 and 2013. They defeated Washington University in Springfield, MA to win the first team national championship in the school's history and then defeated the University of Wisconsin-Whitewater to win their second. In addition to their national championship, the women's team has also won 9 SCAC championships and reached the national quarterfinals four times.

The DePauw University men's basketball team has won two SCAC championships; they also reached the NCAA Division III Final Four two times in their history (3rd place in 1984 under Coach Mike Steele, and National Runner-Up in 1990 under Coach Royce Waltman). Current Clemson Tigers coach Brad Brownell was a star of the 1990 team. In addition to their success on the court, former DePauw basketball player Brad Stevens has found great success coaching as well. After graduating from DePauw in 1999, Stevens went on to coach the Butler Bulldogs at the NCAA Division I level. In the 2009–10 season, Stevens led his team to the national championship game before eventually losing to Duke. Then during the 2010–11 season, he led Butler back to the national championship game again before losing to UConn. Stevens was previously the head coach of the NBA's Boston Celtics and is now the president of basketball operations for the Boston Celtics.

Future U.S. House Representative Lee H. Hamilton lettered in three seasons for the DePauw men's basketball team (in 1949–50, 1950–51, and 1951–52). He twice led the Tigers in rebounding (in 1950–51 with 11.4 rebounds per game and in 1951–52 with 10.7 per game) and once in scoring average (11.4 points per game in 1950–51).

=== Baseball ===
DePauw's baseball team has reached the NCAA Division III tournament six times in their history, and won a school-record 35 games in 2008.

Prominent baseball alumni include former MLB Commissioner Ford Frick and long-time NCAA football coach Dick Tomey.

=== Cross country ===
The women's cross country team have won a total of eight conference championships, seven of which have come in the SCAC. They have additionally reached the NCAA tournament seven times.

The men's cross country have won the SCAC team championship seven times and have reached the NCAA tournament eleven times in their history.

=== Field hockey ===
DePauw's women's field hockey team have made two NCAA tournament appearances in their history and won the SCAC championship in 2007.

=== Football ===
The football program is currently the 17th most winning program in Division III history and have been the co-champions of the SCAC four times.

They currently hold the Monon Bell following a 49–14 victory over their rival, the Wabash Little Giants, on November 12, 2022.

=== Golf ===
DePauw University's women's golf program is the best of any NCAA Division III college in the nation for students seeking a "balanced" experience, according to Golf Digest's third annual College Golf Guide, which appears in the September 2007 issue. In their history, the women's team have national runners-up twice, been in the top four seven times, and made nine consecutive NCAA appearances.

The men's golf team have made 21 NCAA Division III appearances and have been either SCAC champions or runners-up four times.

Former Vice President Dan Quayle, lettered 3 years for the Tigers (1967–69) and finished 10th in the Conference Meet during the 1967 season, leading the Tigers to the best ever finish during their Indiana Collegiate Conference tenure.

=== Lacrosse ===
Lacrosse was added as a men's and women's varsity sport at DePauw University effective with the 2012–13 academic year.

=== Soccer ===
The women's soccer team have made six NCAA appearances, finished in third place nationally in 2003, and have won three SCAC championships in their team's history.

The men's soccer team have made eight NCAA appearances in their history.

=== Softball ===
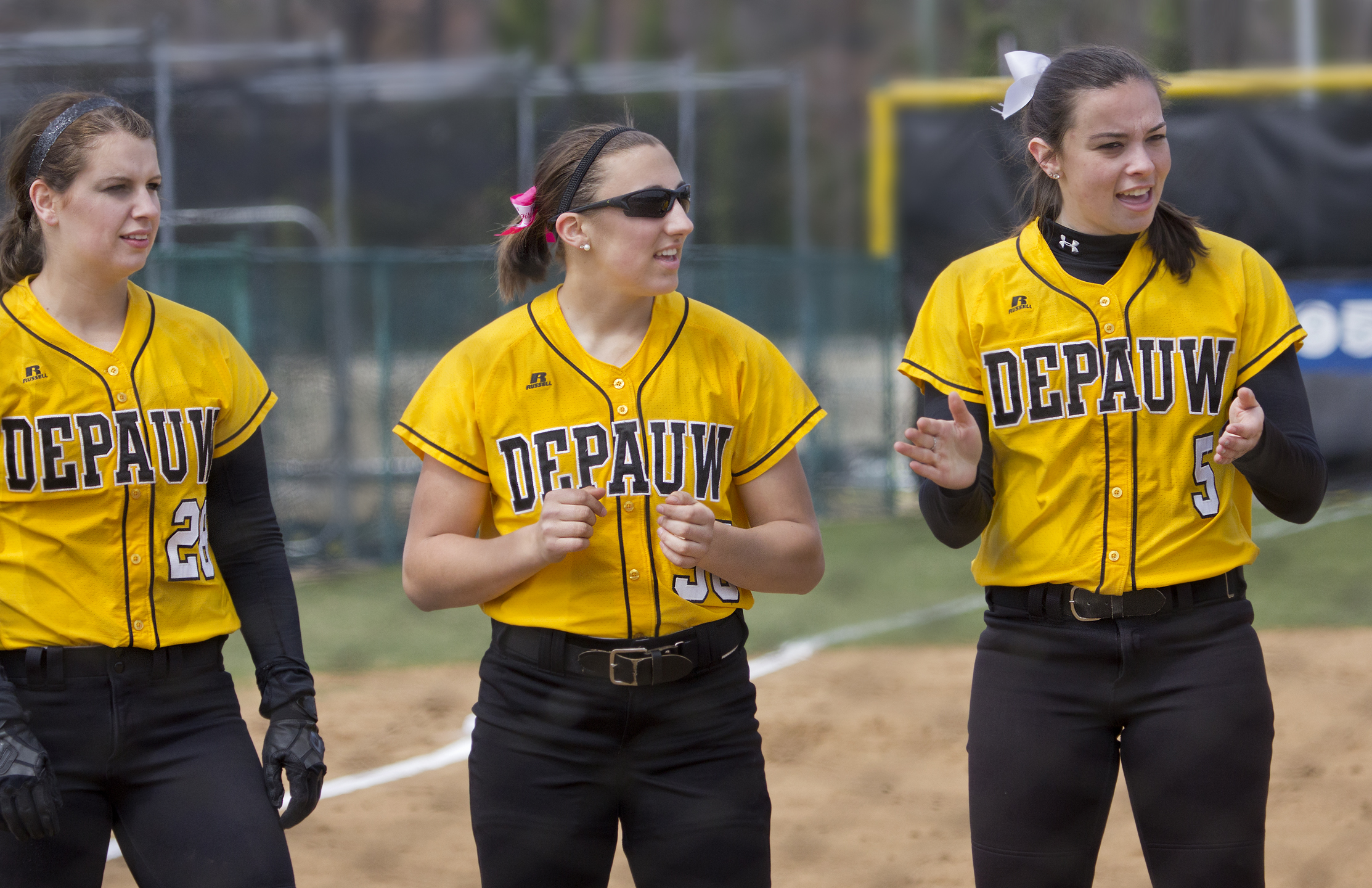
DePauw Tigers softball team

The Tigers softball team won the SCAC championship in 2008 and 2009 and won a Division III-leading 40 wins in 2008. The team has 7 NCAA Division III appearances in last 9 years including a 5th-place NCAA Finish in 2015 (2007, 2010, 2011. 2015). The Tigers have been conference champions 6 of the last 8 seasons and have averaged nearly 33 wins over last 10 seasons

=== Swimming and diving ===
The men's swimming and diving team have won eight total conference championships in their history, and six while in the SCAC.

The women's swimming and diving team finished ninth overall in the 2008 NCAA championships.

=== Tennis ===
The women's tennis team have made eight NCAA team appearances and have won three SCAC team championships. Additionally, DePauw also won the 2007 NCAA singles championship.

The men's tennis team have made 15 NCAA team appearances, were the NCAA quarterfinalists in 2007, and have won three SCAC team championships.

=== Track and field ===
The men's track and field team have won six SCAC team championships and two NCAA individual championships.

The women's track and field team have won three SCAC team championships.

=== Volleyball ===
DePauw's volleyball team have made three NCAA appearances and have been SCAC runners up five times in program history.

== Rivalries ==
=== Monon Bell Classic ===
Voted "Indiana's Best College Sports Rivalry" by viewers of ESPN in 2005, DePauw University and Wabash College play each November—in the last regular season football game of the year for both teams—for the right to keep or reclaim the Monon Bell. The two teams first met in 1890. The game routinely sells out (up to 11,000 seats, depending upon the venue.

DePauw had been a member of the Southern Collegiate Athletic Conference from 1997 to 2011, and won numerous conference championships. DePauw's program had also won the conference's overall "President's Trophy" seven times in that span, including six consecutive President's Trophies from 2005–06 to 2010–11.
