= 1917–18 LSU Tigers basketball team =

American college basketball season

1917–18 LSU Tigers men's basketball
- Conference: Southern Intercollegiate Athletic Association
- Record: 12–1 (3–0 SIAA)
- Head coach: C. C. Stroud
- Captain: Slick Cavett

1917–18 NCAA men's basketball independents standings
| | Conf. | | | | Overall |
| Team | W | | L | PCT | W | | L | PCT |
|---|---|---|---|---|---|---|---|---|
| Canisius | | – | | – | 5 | – | 0 | 1.000 |
| Creighton | | – | | – | 14 | – | 0 | 1.000 |
| Miami (Ohio) | | – | | – | 10 | – | 0 | 1.000 |
| Oregon Agricultural | | – | | – | 15 | – | 0 | 1.000 |
| Rhode Island State | | – | | – | 3 | – | 0 | 1.000 |
| Saint Mary's (Calif.) | | – | | – | 15 | – | 0 | 1.000 |
| Santa Clara | | – | | – | 4 | – | 0 | 1.000 |
| Stevens Institute | | – | | – | 14 | – | 0 | 1.000 |
| Utah State | | – | | – | 9 | – | 0 | 1.000 |
| Wisconsin–Stevens Point | | – | | – | 14 | – | 0 | 1.000 |
| Syracuse | | – | | – | 16 | – | 1 | .941 |
| Union (N.Y.) | | – | | – | 14 | – | 1 | .933 |
| Idaho | | – | | – | 12 | – | 1 | .923 |
| Louisiana State | | – | | – | 12 | – | 1 | .923 |
| Penn State | | – | | – | 12 | – | 1 | .923 |
| Oklahoma | | – | | – | 11 | – | 1 | .917 |
| Central (Ky.) | | – | | – | 10 | – | 1 | .909 |
| Navy | | – | | – | 14 | – | 2 | .875 |
| Virginia | | – | | – | 7 | – | 1 | .875 |
| Geneva | | – | | – | 13 | – | 2 | .867 |
| Georgia | | – | | – | 6 | – | 1 | .857 |
| Washington & Jefferson | | – | | – | 10 | – | 2 | .833 |
| Kentucky | | – | | – | 9 | – | 2 | .818 |
| North Carolina State | | – | | – | 13 | – | 3 | .813 |
| Springfield (Mass.) | | – | | – | 13 | – | 3 | .813 |
| California | | – | | – | 8 | – | 2 | .800 |
| Bucknell | | – | | – | 11 | – | 3 | .786 |
| Tempe Normal | | – | | – | 14 | – | 4 | .778 |
| Valparaiso | | – | | – | 7 | – | 2 | .778 |
| Fordham | | – | | – | 10 | – | 3 | .769 |
| Kalamazoo | | – | | – | 10 | – | 3 | .769 |
| Boston | | – | | – | 6 | – | 2 | .750 |
| Buffalo | | – | | – | 6 | – | 2 | .750 |
| Franklin | | – | | – | 9 | – | 3 | .750 |
| North Carolina | | – | | – | 9 | – | 3 | .750 |
| North Central | | – | | – | 9 | – | 3 | .750 |
| Tulane | | – | | – | 6 | – | 2 | .750 |
| Virginia Tech | | – | | – | 15 | – | 5 | .750 |
| Stanford | | – | | – | 11 | – | 4 | .733 |
| Marietta | | – | | – | 8 | – | 3 | .727 |
| Niagara | | – | | – | 8 | – | 3 | .727 |
| Detroit | | – | | – | 13 | – | 5 | .722 |
| St. Joseph's | | – | | – | 5 | – | 2 | .714 |
| CCNY | | – | | – | 7 | – | 3 | .700 |
| New Mexico A&M | | – | | – | 7 | – | 3 | .700 |
| Akron | | – | | – | 9 | – | 4 | .692 |
| Carleton | | – | | – | 9 | – | 4 | .692 |
| Central Missouri | | – | | – | 9 | – | 4 | .692 |
| Lafayette | | – | | – | 15 | – | 7 | .682 |
| Army | | – | | – | 8 | – | 4 | .667 |
| Trinity (N.C.) | | – | | – | 10 | – | 5 | .667 |
| Vanderbilt | | – | | – | 6 | – | 3 | .667 |
| Western State Normal | | – | | – | 8 | – | 4 | .667 |
| Wyoming | | – | | – | 4 | – | 2 | .667 |
| Grinnell | | – | | – | 7 | – | 4 | .636 |
| Roanoke | | – | | – | 7 | – | 4 | .636 |
| Brigham Young | | – | | – | 5 | – | 3 | .625 |
| Rutgers | | – | | – | 5 | – | 3 | .625 |
| Seton Hall | | – | | – | 8 | – | 5 | .615 |
| South Carolina | | – | | – | 8 | – | 5 | .615 |
| Southwestern (Kan.) | | – | | – | 8 | – | 5 | .615 |
| Arizona | | – | | – | 3 | – | 2 | .600 |
| Bowling Green State | | – | | – | 6 | – | 4 | .600 |
| Clemson | | – | | – | 3 | – | 2 | .600 |
| North Dakota Agricultural | | – | | – | 9 | – | 6 | .600 |
| Davidson | | – | | – | 7 | – | 5 | .583 |
| Denison | | – | | – | 7 | – | 5 | .583 |
| Millsaps | | – | | – | 7 | – | 5 | .583 |
| Swarthmore | | – | | – | 7 | – | 5 | .583 |
| Georgetown | | – | | – | 8 | – | 6 | .571 |
| SMU | | – | | – | 5 | – | 4 | .556 |
| Utah | | – | | – | 5 | – | 4 | .556 |
| Lehigh | | – | | – | 11 | – | 9 | .550 |
| Mount Union | | – | | – | 7 | – | 6 | .538 |
| Temple | | – | | – | 8 | – | 7 | .533 |
| Wabash | | – | | – | 8 | – | 7 | .533 |
| Duquesne | | – | | – | 4 | – | 4 | .500 |
| Indiana State | | – | | – | 8 | – | 8 | .500 |
| Montana | | – | | – | 6 | – | 6 | .500 |
| Nevada | | – | | – | 3 | – | 3 | .500 |
| St. John's (N.Y.) | | – | | – | 8 | – | 8 | .500 |
| Texas Christian | | – | | – | 4 | – | 4 | .500 |
| VMI | | – | | – | 6 | – | 6 | .500 |
| Millikin | | – | | – | 10 | – | 11 | .476 |
| DePauw | | – | | – | 7 | – | 8 | .467 |
| Catholic | | – | | – | 5 | – | 6 | .455 |
| Delaware | | – | | – | 5 | – | 6 | .455 |
| Washington and Lee | | – | | – | 5 | – | 6 | .455 |
| Bradley | | – | | – | 6 | – | 8 | .429 |
| Colgate | | – | | – | 9 | – | 12 | .429 |
| Louisville | | – | | – | 3 | – | 4 | .429 |
| Manhattan | | – | | – | 6 | – | 8 | .429 |
| Northern Colorado | | – | | – | 3 | – | 4 | .429 |
| Gettysburg | | – | | – | 5 | – | 7 | .417 |
| Auburn | | – | | – | 2 | – | 3 | .400 |
| Beloit | | – | | – | 4 | – | 6 | .400 |
| Marquette | | – | | – | 4 | – | 6 | .400 |
| Michigan State | | – | | – | 6 | – | 10 | .375 |
| Washington State | | – | | – | 7 | – | 12 | .368 |
| Pittsburgh | | – | | – | 5 | – | 9 | .357 |
| William & Mary | | – | | – | 6 | – | 11 | .353 |
| Dayton | | – | | – | 2 | – | 4 | .333 |
| Notre Dame | | – | | – | 2 | – | 4 | .333 |
| Ohio | | – | | – | 4 | – | 8 | .333 |
| Richmond | | – | | – | 3 | – | 6 | .333 |
| Toledo | | – | | – | 2 | – | 4 | .333 |
| Washington | | – | | – | 4 | – | 8 | .333 |
| Wooster | | – | | – | 4 | – | 9 | .308 |
| Alabama | | – | | – | 2 | – | 5 | .286 |
| Oregon | | – | | – | 3 | – | 8 | .273 |
| Cincinnati | | – | | – | 2 | – | 6 | .250 |
| Montana State | | – | | – | 2 | – | 6 | .250 |
| Tennessee | | – | | – | 3 | – | 9 | .250 |
| Wake Forest | | – | | – | 4 | – | 12 | .250 |
| West Virginia | | – | | – | 4 | – | 13 | .235 |
| Fairmount | | – | | – | 3 | – | 10 | .231 |
| Grove City | | – | | – | 2 | – | 7 | .222 |
| Saint Louis | | – | | – | 3 | – | 12 | .200 |
| Washburn | | – | | – | 2 | – | 9 | .182 |
| Tulsa | | – | | – | 1 | – | 5 | .167 |
| Connecticut | | – | | – | 1 | – | 6 | .143 |
| New York University | | – | | – | 1 | – | 10 | .091 |
| Butler | | – | | – | 0 | – | 6 | .000 |
| The Citadel | | – | | – | 0 | – | 1 | .000 |
| Muhlenberg | | – | | – | 0 | – | 7 | .000 |
| Southern California | | – | | – | 0 | – | 2 | .000 |

The 1917–18 LSU Tigers basketball team represented Louisiana State University during the 1917–18 college men's basketball season. The coach was C. C. Stroud.
