= 1917–18 Idaho Vandals men's basketball team =

American college basketball season

1917–18 Idaho Vandals men's basketball

Northwest Conference champions
- Conference: Northwest Conference
- Record: 12–2 ( Northwest Conference)
- Head coach: Hec Edmundson (2nd season)
- Captain: Elra "Squinty" Hunter
- Home arena: Armory and Gymnasium

1917–18 NCAA men's basketball independents standings
	Conf.				Overall
Team	W		L	PCT	W		L	PCT
Canisius		–		–	5	–	0	1.000
Creighton		–		–	14	–	0	1.000
Miami (Ohio)		–		–	10	–	0	1.000
Oregon Agricultural		–		–	15	–	0	1.000
Rhode Island State		–		–	3	–	0	1.000
Saint Mary's (Calif.)		–		–	15	–	0	1.000
Santa Clara		–		–	4	–	0	1.000
Stevens Institute		–		–	14	–	0	1.000
Utah State		–		–	9	–	0	1.000
Wisconsin–Stevens Point		–		–	14	–	0	1.000
Syracuse		–		–	16	–	1	.941
Union (N.Y.)		–		–	14	–	1	.933
Idaho		–		–	12	–	1	.923
Louisiana State		–		–	12	–	1	.923
Penn State		–		–	12	–	1	.923
Oklahoma		–		–	11	–	1	.917
Central (Ky.)		–		–	10	–	1	.909
Navy		–		–	14	–	2	.875
Virginia		–		–	7	–	1	.875
Geneva		–		–	13	–	2	.867
Georgia		–		–	6	–	1	.857
Washington & Jefferson		–		–	10	–	2	.833
Kentucky		–		–	9	–	2	.818
North Carolina State		–		–	13	–	3	.813
Springfield (Mass.)		–		–	13	–	3	.813
California		–		–	8	–	2	.800
Bucknell		–		–	11	–	3	.786
Tempe Normal		–		–	14	–	4	.778
Valparaiso		–		–	7	–	2	.778
Fordham		–		–	10	–	3	.769
Kalamazoo		–		–	10	–	3	.769
Boston		–		–	6	–	2	.750
Buffalo		–		–	6	–	2	.750
Franklin		–		–	9	–	3	.750
North Carolina		–		–	9	–	3	.750
North Central		–		–	9	–	3	.750
Tulane		–		–	6	–	2	.750
Virginia Tech		–		–	15	–	5	.750
Stanford		–		–	11	–	4	.733
Marietta		–		–	8	–	3	.727
Niagara		–		–	8	–	3	.727
Detroit		–		–	13	–	5	.722
St. Joseph's		–		–	5	–	2	.714
CCNY		–		–	7	–	3	.700
New Mexico A&M		–		–	7	–	3	.700
Akron		–		–	9	–	4	.692
Carleton		–		–	9	–	4	.692
Central Missouri		–		–	9	–	4	.692
Lafayette		–		–	15	–	7	.682
Army		–		–	8	–	4	.667
Trinity (N.C.)		–		–	10	–	5	.667
Vanderbilt		–		–	6	–	3	.667
Western State Normal		–		–	8	–	4	.667
Wyoming		–		–	4	–	2	.667
Grinnell		–		–	7	–	4	.636
Roanoke		–		–	7	–	4	.636
Brigham Young		–		–	5	–	3	.625
Rutgers		–		–	5	–	3	.625
Seton Hall		–		–	8	–	5	.615
South Carolina		–		–	8	–	5	.615
Southwestern (Kan.)		–		–	8	–	5	.615
Arizona		–		–	3	–	2	.600
Bowling Green State		–		–	6	–	4	.600
Clemson		–		–	3	–	2	.600
North Dakota Agricultural		–		–	9	–	6	.600
Davidson		–		–	7	–	5	.583
Denison		–		–	7	–	5	.583
Millsaps		–		–	7	–	5	.583
Swarthmore		–		–	7	–	5	.583
Georgetown		–		–	8	–	6	.571
SMU		–		–	5	–	4	.556
Utah		–		–	5	–	4	.556
Lehigh		–		–	11	–	9	.550
Mount Union		–		–	7	–	6	.538
Temple		–		–	8	–	7	.533
Wabash		–		–	8	–	7	.533
Duquesne		–		–	4	–	4	.500
Indiana State		–		–	8	–	8	.500
Montana		–		–	6	–	6	.500
Nevada		–		–	3	–	3	.500
St. John's (N.Y.)		–		–	8	–	8	.500
Texas Christian		–		–	4	–	4	.500
VMI		–		–	6	–	6	.500
Millikin		–		–	10	–	11	.476
DePauw		–		–	7	–	8	.467
Catholic		–		–	5	–	6	.455
Delaware		–		–	5	–	6	.455
Washington and Lee		–		–	5	–	6	.455
Bradley		–		–	6	–	8	.429
Colgate		–		–	9	–	12	.429
Louisville		–		–	3	–	4	.429
Manhattan		–		–	6	–	8	.429
Northern Colorado		–		–	3	–	4	.429
Gettysburg		–		–	5	–	7	.417
Auburn		–		–	2	–	3	.400
Beloit		–		–	4	–	6	.400
Marquette		–		–	4	–	6	.400
Michigan State		–		–	6	–	10	.375
Washington State		–		–	7	–	12	.368
Pittsburgh		–		–	5	–	9	.357
William & Mary		–		–	6	–	11	.353
Dayton		–		–	2	–	4	.333
Notre Dame		–		–	2	–	4	.333
Ohio		–		–	4	–	8	.333
Richmond		–		–	3	–	6	.333
Toledo		–		–	2	–	4	.333
Washington		–		–	4	–	8	.333
Wooster		–		–	4	–	9	.308
Alabama		–		–	2	–	5	.286
Oregon		–		–	3	–	8	.273
Cincinnati		–		–	2	–	6	.250
Montana State		–		–	2	–	6	.250
Tennessee		–		–	3	–	9	.250
Wake Forest		–		–	4	–	12	.250
West Virginia		–		–	4	–	13	.235
Fairmount		–		–	3	–	10	.231
Grove City		–		–	2	–	7	.222
Saint Louis		–		–	3	–	12	.200
Washburn		–		–	2	–	9	.182
Tulsa		–		–	1	–	5	.167
Connecticut		–		–	1	–	6	.143
New York University		–		–	1	–	10	.091
Butler		–		–	0	–	6	.000
The Citadel		–		–	0	–	1	.000
Muhlenberg		–		–	0	–	7	.000
Southern California		–		–	0	–	2	.000

The 1917–18 Idaho Vandals men's basketball team represented the University of Idaho during the 1917–18 college basketball season. The Vandals were led by second-year head coach Hec Edmundson and played their home games on campus at the Armory and Gymnasium in Moscow, Idaho.

The Vandals were 12–2 overall.play. Due to World War I, freshmen were allowed to play varsity sports and the Vandals had five in the starting lineup.

This was the final year at Idaho for alumnus Edmundson, a Moscow native (and an Olympian in track in 1912). He coached at Washington in Seattle for decades, starting in 1920.
