= 1917–18 NC State Wolfpack men's basketball team =

American college basketball season

1917–18 NC State Wolfpack men's basketball
- Conference: Independent
- Record: 12–2
- Head coach: Harry Hartsell (1st season)
- Captain: Elbert F. Lewis

The 1917–18 NC State Wolfpack men's basketball team represented North Carolina State University during the 1917–18 NCAA men's basketball season. The head coach was Harry Hartsell coaching the team in his first season.

== Schedule ==
Date time, TV	Opponent	Result	Record	Site city, state
*	Durham YMCA	W 27–25	1–0	Raleigh, NC
*	Duke	L 26–35	1–1	Raleigh, NC
*	Guilford	W 35–17	2–1	Raleigh, NC
*	Wake Forest	W 30–8	3–1	Raleigh, NC
*	Duke	W 28–18	4–1	Raleigh, NC
*	Elon	W 38–18	5–1	Raleigh, NC
*	Wake Forest	W 20–17	6–1	Raleigh, NC
*	at Elon	W 24–13	7–1	Elon, NC
*	at Lynchburg Ath. Club	W 27–15	8–1	
*	at Washington and Lee	W 48–20	9–1	Washington, PA
*	at VMI	L 18–35	9–2	Lexington, VA
*	Wake Forest	W 31–17	10–2	Raleigh, NC
*	South Carolina	W 32–12	11–2	Raleigh, NC
*	Duke	W 15–10	12–2	The Ark; Durham, NC
*Non-conference game. (#) Tournament seedings in parentheses.
