= Millsaps Majors =

- University: Millsaps College
- Conference: Southern Athletic Association
- NCAA: Division III
- Athletic director: Justin Leblanc
- Location: Jackson, Mississippi
- Varsity teams: 18
- Football stadium: Harper Davis Field (football, soccer, and lacrosse)
- Basketball arena: The Hangar Dome (basketball and volleyball)
- Baseball stadium: Twenty Field
- Other venues: Millsaps Softball stadium
- Mascot: The Millsaps Major
- Nickname: Majors
- Fight song: "Purple and White" ("Notre Dame Victory March")
- Colors: Purple and White
- Website: gomajors.com
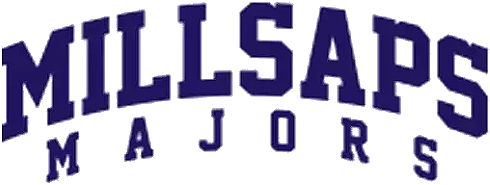

The Millsaps Majors is the nickname for the sports teams of Millsaps College in Jackson, Mississippi and their colors are purple and white. They participate in the NCAA's Division III and the Southern Athletic Association.

Men participate in baseball, basketball, cheerleading, football, soccer, tennis, golf, lacrosse, track and field, swimming and diving, and cross country. Women's sports include basketball, softball, soccer, tennis, golf, cross country, lacrosse, track and field, swimming and diving, and volleyball.

== Football ==
Millsaps's all-time record in football is 380 wins, 356 losses and 36 ties (.516). The gridiron Majors have posted two undefeated regular seasons in their history (1980 & 2008), earned three NCAA playoff tournament berths (1975, 2006 & 2008) and claimed six Southern Collegiate Athletic Conference championships (1991, 1996, 2006, 2007, 2008 & 2009).

== Baseball ==
2009 saw the Majors end the regular season with a 32–8 winning record (15–5 SCAC) and a SCAC West Division championship. On April 14, 2009, the Majors were named the No. 1 team in the country by D3baseball.com for the first time in the programs history. It was the first time any athletic team has achieved this high of a ranking.

=== Major League Baseball draft ===
Millsaps has had 3 Major League Baseball draft selections since the draft began in 1965.

Year	Player	Round	Team
1997	Peter Austin	40	Pirates
2005	Garner Wetzel	10	Rockies
2006	Garner Wetzel	18	Padres

== Lacrosse ==
Both men and women began lacrosse teams in 2010.

== Rivalries ==
The Majors had a fierce football and basketball rivalry with Mississippi College in nearby Clinton through the 1950s before competition was suspended after an infamous student brawl at a basketball game. Campus legend says the brawl was sparked by the alleged theft of the body of Millsaps founder Major Millsaps by Mississippi College students. The rivalry was considered by many as the best in Mississippi, featuring a prank by Mississippi College students who painted "TO HELL WITH MILSAPS" (sic) on the Millsaps Observatory. The football rivalry resumed in 2000 as the "Backyard Brawl", with games being held at Mississippi Veterans Memorial Stadium until 2006 when it was played at Robinson-Hale Stadium on the campus of Mississippi College. The rivalry took a one-year hiatus in 2005 but resumed in 2006.

== NFL affiliation ==
Millsaps was the summer training camp home for the NFL's New Orleans Saints in 2006, 2007 and 2008.
