= 1918–19 NCAA men's basketball season =

Men's collegiate basketball season

- Helms National Champions: Minnesota (retroactive selection in 1943)
- Player of the Year (Helms): Erling Platou, Minnesota (retroactive selection in 1944)

The 1918–19 NCAA men's basketball season began in December 1918, progressed through the regular season, and concluded in March 1919.

== Season headlines ==
- The 1918–19 season took place between the fall 1918 second surge and spring 1919 third surge of the so-called "Spanish flu" pandemic, forcing some schools to play shortened seasons or cancel their seasons. Young men leaving school for World War I military service also affected teams.
- In February 1943, the Helms Athletic Foundation retroactively selected Minnesota as its national champion for the 1918–19 season.
- In 1995, the Premo-Porretta Power Poll retroactively selected Navy as its top-ranked team for the 1918–19 season.

== Conference membership changes ==
School	Former Conference	New Conference
Grinnell Pioneers	Independent	Missouri Valley Intercollegiate Athletic Association
Oklahoma A&M Aggies	Southwest Conference	Independent
SMU Mustangs	Independent	Southwest Conference
Stanford Indians	Independent	Pacific Coast Conference
Washington State Cougars	Independent	Pacific Coast Conference

== Regular season ==
=== Conferences ===
==== Conference winners ====
Conference	Regular Season Winner	Conference Player of the Year	Conference Tournament	Tournament Venue (City)	Tournament Winner
Big Ten Conference	Minnesota	None selected	No Tournament		
Eastern Intercollegiate Basketball League	Penn	None selected	No Tournament		
Missouri Valley Intercollegiate Athletic Association	Kansas State	None selected	No Tournament		
Pacific Coast Conference	Oregon		No Tournament		
Rocky Mountain Athletic Conference	Colorado		No Tournament		
Southwest Conference	Texas	None selected	No Tournament		

==== Conference standings ====
1918–19 Big Ten Conference men's basketball standings
	Conf.				Overall
Team	W		L	PCT	W		L	PCT
Minnesota	10	–	0	1.000	13	–	0	1.000
Chicago	10	–	2	.833	21	–	6	.778
Northwestern	6	–	4	.600	6	–	6	.500
Michigan	5	–	5	.500	18	–	6	.750
Illinois	5	–	7	.417	6	–	8	.429
Indiana	4	–	6	.400	10	–	7	.588
Iowa	4	–	7	.364	8	–	7	.533
Purdue	4	–	7	.364	6	–	8	.429
Wisconsin	3	–	9	.250	5	–	11	.313
Ohio State	2	–	6	.250	7	–	12	.368

1918–19 Pacific Coast Conference men's basketball standings
	Conf.				Overall
Team	W		L	PCT	W		L	PCT
Oregon	11	–	3	.786	13	–	4	.765
Washington State	7	–	5	.583	10	–	11	.476
California	2	–	2	.500	6	–	3	.667
Washington	5	–	7	.417	6	–	10	.375
Oregon Agricultural	3	–	9	.250	3	–	13	.188
Stanford	0	–	2	.000	9	–	3	.750
As of 1919

1918–19 Eastern Intercollegiate Basketball League standings
	Conf.				Overall
Team	W		L	PCT	W		L	PCT
Penn	7	–	1	.875	15	–	1	.938
Yale	4	–	2	.667	7	–	2	.778
Cornell	2	–	3	.400	11	–	3	.786
Princeton	2	–	5	.286	5	–	5	.500
Columbia	2	–	6	.250	3	–	7	.300

1918–19 Rocky Mountain Conference standings
	Conf.				Overall
Team	W		L	PCT	W		L	PCT
Colorado		–		–	8	–	1	.889
Colorado College		–		–	8	–	3	.727
Denver		–		–	5	–	4	.556
Colorado Mines		–		–	2	–	6	.250
Colorado Agricultural		–		–	1	–	13	.071

1918–19 Missouri Valley Intercollegiate Athletic Association men's basketball standings
	Conf.				Overall
Team	W		L	PCT	W		L	PCT
Kansas State	10	–	2	.833	16	–	2	.889
Missouri	11	–	3	.786	14	–	3	.824
Nebraska	10	–	6	.625	10	–	6	.625
Grinnell	5	–	3	.625	6	–	5	.545
Kansas	5	–	9	.357	7	–	9	.438
Iowa State	3	–	8	.273	5	–	11	.313
Washington University	2	–	8	.200	9	–	9	.500
Drake	2	–	9	.182	10	–	18	.357

1918–19 Southwest Conference men's basketball standings
	Conf.				Overall
Team	W		L	PCT	W		L	PCT
Texas	11	–	2	.846	17	–	3	.850
Texas A&M	7	–	3	.700	14	–	4	.778
SMU	5	–	6	.455	7	–	8	.467
Rice	2	–	8	.200	4	–	10	.286
Baylor	2	–	8	.200	2	–	9	.182

=== Independents ===
A total of 122 college teams played as major independents. Among independents that played at least 10 games, Akron (14–0), Centre (11–0), Creighton (14–0), Navy (16–0), and Oklahoma (12–0) were undefeated, and Fordham (24–5) finished with the most wins.

1918–19 NCAA men's basketball independents standings
	Conf.				Overall
Team	W		L	PCT	W		L	PCT
Akron		–		–	14	–	0	1.000
Centre (KY)		–		–	11	–	0	1.000
The Citadel		–		–	9	–	0	1.000
Creighton		–		–	14	–	0	1.000
Louisiana State		–		–	1	–	0	1.000
Navy		–		–	16	–	0	1.000
Niagara		–		–	1	–	0	1.000
Oklahoma		–		–	12	–	0	1.000
Washington College		–		–	1	–	0	1.000
Santa Clara		–		–	14	–	1	.933
Southwestern (KS)		–		–	13	–	1	.929
Georgetown		–		–	9	–	1	.900
Rhode Island State		–		–	7	–	1	.875
Idaho		–		–	13	–	2	.867
Beloit		–		–	12	–	2	.857
Roanoke		–		–	12	–	2	.857
Penn State		–		–	11	–	2	.846
Toledo		–		–	10	–	2	.833
Fordham		–		–	24	–	5	.828
Virginia Tech		–		–	18	–	4	.818
Bucknell		–		–	13	–	3	.813
Denison		–		–	13	–	3	.813
Syracuse		–		–	13	–	3	.813
Delaware		–		–	8	–	2	.800
DePauw		–		–	12	–	3	.800
New Mexico A&M		–		–	8	–	2	.800
Vanderbilt		–		–	8	–	2	.800
North Carolina State		–		–	11	–	3	.786
Utah		–		–	7	–	2	.778
Wyoming		–		–	7	–	2	.778
Washington and Lee		–		–	10	–	3	.769
Wabash		–		–	13	–	4	.765
Clemson		–		–	3	–	1	.750
Lafayette		–		–	12	–	4	.750
Millikin		–		–	12	–	4	.750
Millsaps		–		–	9	–	3	.750
North Dakota		–		–	6	–	2	.750
Saint Francis (PA)		–		–	9	–	3	.750
Virginia		–		–	11	–	4	.733
Western State Normal		–		–	11	–	4	.733
Carleton		–		–	8	–	3	.727
Union (NY)		–		–	8	–	3	.727
Michigan State Normal		–		–	10	–	4	.714
Central Missouri		–		–	14	–	6	.700
Washington & Jefferson		–		–	7	–	3	.700
Colgate		–		–	13	–	6	.684
Arizona		–		–	6	–	3	.667
CCNY		–		–	8	–	4	.667
Indiana State		–		–	6	–	3	.667
Northern Arizona Normal		–		–	4	–	2	.667
Rutgers		–		–	6	–	3	.667
Tulane		–		–	6	–	3	.667
Utah State		–		–	6	–	3	.667
Washburn		–		–	10	–	5	.667
Gettysburg		–		–	9	–	5	.643
North Dakota Agricultural		–		–	9	–	5	.643
Louisville		–		–	7	–	4	.636
Mount Union		–		–	7	–	4	.636
Brigham Young		–		–	5	–	3	.625
Georgia		–		–	5	–	3	.625
Tulsa		–		–	5	–	3	.625
Buffalo		–		–	8	–	5	.615
Lehigh		–		–	8	–	5	.615
Stevens Institute		–		–	8	–	5	.615
WPI		–		–	8	–	5	.615
Miami (Ohio)		–		–	7	–	5	.583
Auburn		–		–	4	–	3	.571
Catholic		–		–	4	–	3	.571
Marietta		–		–	8	–	6	.571
Mississippi A&M		–		–	4	–	3	.571
VMI		–		–	8	–	6	.571
North Carolina		–		–	9	–	7	.563
Ohio		–		–	5	–	4	.556
Trinity (N.C.)		–		–	6	–	5	.545
Franklin		–		–	7	–	6	.538
Alabama		–		–	3	–	3	.500
Kalamazoo		–		–	7	–	7	.500
Michigan State		–		–	9	–	9	.500
Oklahoma A&M		–		–	5	–	5	.500
Pittsburgh		–		–	7	–	7	.500
St. Joseph's		–		–	3	–	3	.500
West Virginia		–		–	8	–	8	.500
New York University		–		–	5	–	6	.455
Swarthmore		–		–	5	–	6	.455
Detroit		–		–	4	–	5	.444
Dayton		–		–	3	–	4	.429
Tempe Normal		–		–	3	–	4	.429
Kentucky		–		–	6	–	8	.429
Wooster		–		–	6	–	8	.429
Bradley		–		–	6	–	9	.400
Duquesne		–		–	4	–	6	.400
Springfield (Mass.)		–		–	4	–	6	.400
Texas Christian		–		–	4	–	6	.400
Wake Forest		–		–	6	–	9	.400
Muhlenberg		–		–	7	–	11	.389
Nevada		–		–	5	–	8	.385
Army		–		–	3	–	5	.375
South Carolina		–		–	4	–	7	.364
Northern Colorado		–		–	5	–	9	.357
Davidson		–		–	3	–	6	.333
Manhattan		–		–	2	–	4	.333
Montana State		–		–	1	–	2	.333
New Mexico		–		–	2	–	4	.333
Saint Louis		–		–	4	–	8	.333
Saint Mary's (CA)		–		–	3	–	6	.333
Valparaiso		–		–	1	–	2	.333
William & Mary		–		–	3	–	6	.333
Bowling Green State		–		–	2	–	5	.286
Marshall		–		–	2	–	5	.286
Southern California		–		–	3	–	8	.273
Grove City		–		–	3	–	9	.250
Tennessee		–		–	2	–	6	.250
Cincinnati		–		–	3	–	11	.214
North Central		–		–	3	–	11	.214
Notre Dame		–		–	2	–	10	.167
Richmond		–		–	1	–	5	.167
Brown		–		–	2	–	12	.143
Fairmount		–		–	1	–	7	.125
Connecticut		–		–	1	–	8	.111
Butler		–		–	1	–	9	.100
Ole Miss		–		–	0	–	3	.000
St. John's (NY)		–		–	0	–	7	.000

== Awards ==
=== Helms College Basketball All-Americans ===
The practice of selecting a Consensus All-American Team did not begin until the 1928–29 season. The Helms Athletic Foundation later retroactively selected a list of All-Americans for the 1918–19 season.

Player	Team
Lance Farwell	Navy
Tony Hinkle	Chicago
Dutch Lonborg	Kansas
Leon Marcus	Syracuse
Dan McNichol	Penn
Arnold Oss	Minnesota
George Parrish	Virginia Tech
Erling Platou	Minnesota
Craig Ruby	Missouri
Andrew Stannard	Penn

=== Major player of the year awards ===
- Helms Player of the Year: Erling Platou, Minnesota (retroactive selection in 1944)

== Coaching changes ==
A number of teams changed coaches during the season and after it ended.

Team	Former Coach	Interim Coach	New Coach	Reason
Alabama	Yancey Goodall		Bill Moore	
Army	Ivens Jones		Joseph O'Shea	
Bradley	Harold Olsen		Fred Brown	
Brown	Louis Pieri		Ed Freeman	
Bucknell	Haps Benfer		Malcolm Musser	
Butler	Joe Mullane		F. E. Ellis	
Central Missouri	Phog Allen		William N. Greim	Allen left to coach at Kansas.
Clemson	Edward Donahue		Country Morris	
Colgate	Walt Hammond		William Reid	
Columbia	Fred Dawson		Claus Benson	
Connecticut	John F. Donahue		Ross Swartz	
Cornell	Albert Sharpe		Howard Ortner	Sharpe left to coach Yale and be the athletic director and football coach.
Dayton	Al Mahrt		Harry Solimano	
Denver	Charles Wingender		George Koonsman	
Detroit	Royal R. Campbell		James M. Brown	
Fordham	Edward Siskind		Arthur Devlin	
Georgia	Kennon Mott		Herman Stegeman	
Idaho	Wilfred C. Bleamaster		Ralph Hutchinson	
Indiana	Dana Evans		Ewald O. Stiehm	
Iowa	Edwin Bannick		James N. Ashmore	
Iowa State	H. H. Walters		Punk Berryman	
Kansas	W. O. Hamilton		Phog Allen	
Kentucky	Thomas Andrew Gill		George Buchheit	
Lafayette	Bill Anderson		William McAvoy	
Lehigh	Roy Geary		J. Murphy	
Louisiana State	R. E. Edmonds		Charles C. Stroud	
Louisville	Earl Ford		Tuley Brucker	
Miami (Ohio)	George Rider		George Little	
Michigan	Elmer Mitchell		E. J. Mather	
Missouri	John F. Miller		Walter Meanwell	
Montana State	Fred Bennion		Walter D. Powell	
NC State	Tal Stafford		Richard Crozier	
Nebraska	E. J. Stewart		Paul J. Schissler	
Nevada	Silas Ross		Ray Courtright	
New Mexico	John F. McGough		Roy W. Johnson	
Niagara	John O'Shea		John F. Blake	
North Carolina	Howell Peacock		Fred Boye	
North Dakota	Harry Caldwell		Phil J. Davis	
North Dakota Agricultural	Curly Movold		Stanley Borleske	
Northern Colorado	Ralph Glaze		William E. Search	
Northwestern	Tom Robinson		J. Norman Elliott	
Notre Dame	Jesse Harper		Gus Dorais	
Ohio State	Lynn St. John		George Trautman	
Oklahoma A&M	Earl A. Pritchard		Jim Pixlee	
Ole Miss	Dudy Noble		R. L. Sullivan	
Rhode Island State	Mysterious Walker		Fred Murray	
Rice	Wilbur Tisdale		Leslie Mann	
Richmond	Robert C. Marshall		Frank Dobson	
Saint Joseph's	John Donahue		John Lavin	
Santa Clara	Norbert Keefe		Robert E. Harmon	
Southern California	Motts Blair		Gus Henderson	
Tennessee	R. H. Fitzgerald		John R. Bender	
Texas	Roy Henderson		Berry Whitaker	
Toledo	Sam Monetta		Watt Hobt	
Trinity (N.C.)	Henry Cole		Walter Rothensies	
Utah State	Joseph Jensen		Dick Romney	
Valparaiso	Sidney Winters		George Keogan	
Vanderbilt	Ray Morrison		Guy T. Denton	
VMI	Earl Abell		Pinky Spruhan	
Wake Forest	Irving E. Carlyle		Bill Holding	
West Virginia	H. P. Mullenex		Francis Stadsvold	
Yale	Walter Mace		Albert Sharpe	
