= List of Kansas Jayhawks men's basketball seasons =

This is a list of seasons completed by the Kansas Jayhawks men's college basketball team.

== Season-by-season results ==
Statistics overview
Season	Coach	Overall	Conference	Standing	Postseason
James Naismith (Independent) (1898–1907)
1898–99	James Naismith	7–4	–	–	–
1899–1900	James Naismith	3–4	–	–	–
1900–01	James Naismith	4–8	–	–	–
1901–02	James Naismith	5–7	–	–	–
1902–03	James Naismith	7–8	–	–	–
1903–04	James Naismith	5–8	–	–	–
1904–05	James Naismith	5–6	–	–	–
1905–06	James Naismith	12–7	–	–	–
1906–07	James Naismith	7–8	–	–	–
James Naismith:		55–60	–		
Phog Allen (Missouri Valley Intercollegiate Athletic Association) (1907–1909)
1907–08	Phog Allen	18–6	6–0	1st	–
1908–09	Phog Allen	25–3	8–2	1st	–
Phog Allen:		43–9	14–2		
William O. Hamilton (Missouri Valley Intercollegiate Athletic Association) (1909–1919)
1909–10	William Hamilton	18–1	7–1	1st	–
1910–11	William Hamilton	12–6	9–3	1st	–
1911–12	William Hamilton	11–7	6–2	1st	–
1912–13	William Hamilton	16–6	8–3	2nd	–
1913–14	William Hamilton	17–1	13–1	T–1st	–
1914–15	William Hamilton	16–1	13–1	1st	–
1915–16	William Hamilton	6–12	5–11	4th	–
1916–17	William Hamilton	12–8	9–7	4th	–
1917–18	William Hamilton	10–8	9–8	3rd	–
1918–19	William Hamilton	7–9	5–9	5th	–
William Hamilton:		125–59	84–46		
Phog Allen (MVIAA/Big Six/Big Seven Conference) (1919–1956)
1919–20	Karl Schlademan; Phog Allen	1–0^{[Note A]} 10–7	0–0; 9–7	3rd	–
1920–21	Phog Allen	10–8	10–8	4th	–
1921–22	Phog Allen	16–2	15–1	T–1st	Helms National Champion
1922–23	Phog Allen	17–1	16–0	1st	Helms National Champion
1923–24	Phog Allen	16–3	15–1	1st	–
1924–25	Phog Allen	17–1	15–1	1st	–
1925–26	Phog Allen	16–2	16–2	1st	–
1926–27	Phog Allen	15–2	10–2	1st	–
1927–28	Phog Allen	9–9	9–9	4th	–
1928–29	Phog Allen	3–15	2–8	T–5th	–
1929–30	Phog Allen	14–4	7–3	2nd	–
1930–31	Phog Allen	15–3	7–3	1st	–
1931–32	Phog Allen	13–5	7–3	1st	–
1932–33	Phog Allen	13–4	8–2	1st	–
1933–34	Phog Allen	16–1	9–1	1st	–
1934–35	Phog Allen	15–5	12–4	2nd	–
1935–36	Phog Allen	21–2	10–0	1st	–
1936–37	Phog Allen	15–4	8–2	T–1st	–
1937–38	Phog Allen	18–2	9–1	1st	–
1938–39	Phog Allen	13–7	6–4	3rd	–
1939–40	Phog Allen	19–6	8–2	T–1st	NCAA Runner-up
1940–41	Phog Allen	12–6	7–3	T–1st	–
1941–42	Phog Allen	17–5	8–2	T–1st	NCAA Elite Eight
1942–43	Phog Allen	22–6	10–0	1st	–
1943–44	Phog Allen	17–9	5–5	3rd	–
1944–45	Phog Allen	12–5	7–3	2nd	–
1945–46	Phog Allen	19–2	10–0	1st	–
1946–47	Phog Allen; Howard Engleman	8–5; 8–6^{[Note B]}	0–1; 5–4	T–3rd	–
1947–48	Phog Allen	9–15	4–8	T–6th	–
1948–49	Phog Allen	12–12	3–9	T–6th	–
1949–50	Phog Allen	14–11	8–4	T–1st	–
1950–51	Phog Allen	16–8	8–4	T–2nd	–
1951–52	Phog Allen	28–3	11–1	1st	NCAA Champion
1952–53	Phog Allen	19–6	10–2	1st	NCAA Runner-up
1953–54	Phog Allen	16–5	10–2	T–1st	–
1954–55	Phog Allen	11–10	5–7	5th	–
1955–56	Phog Allen	14–9	6–6	5th	–
Phog Allen:		547–210 (590–219)	320–121 (334–123)		
Dick Harp (Big Seven/Big Eight Conference) (1956–1964)
1956–57	Dick Harp	24–3	11–1	1st	NCAA University Division Runner-up
1957–58	Dick Harp	18–5	8–4	T–2nd	–
1958–59	Dick Harp	11–14	8–6	T–3rd	–
1959–60	Dick Harp	19–9	10–4	T–1st	NCAA University Division Elite Eight
1960–61	Dick Harp	17–8	10–4	T–2nd	–
1961–62	Dick Harp	7–18	3–11	T–7th	–
1962–63	Dick Harp	12–13	5–9	T–6th	–
1963–64	Dick Harp	13–12	8–6	3rd	–
Dick Harp:		121–82	63–45		
Ted Owens (Big Eight Conference) (1964–1983)
1964–65	Ted Owens	17–8	9–5	2nd	–
1965–66	Ted Owens	23–4	13–1	1st	NCAA University Division Elite Eight
1966–67	Ted Owens	23–4	13–1	1st	NCAA University Division Sweet Sixteen
1967–68	Ted Owens	22–8	10–4	2nd	NIT Runner-up
1968–69	Ted Owens	20–7	9–5	T–2nd	NIT first round
1969–70	Ted Owens	17–9	8–6	2nd	–
1970–71	Ted Owens	27–3	14–0	1st	NCAA University Division Final Four
1971–72	Ted Owens	11–15	7–7	T–4th	–
1972–73	Ted Owens	8–18	4–10	T–6th	–
1973–74	Ted Owens	23–7	13–1	1st	NCAA Division I Final Four
1974–75	Ted Owens	19–8	11–3	1st	NCAA Division I first round
1975–76	Ted Owens	13–13	6–8	T–4th	–
1976–77	Ted Owens	18–10	8–6	4th	–
1977–78	Ted Owens	24–5	13–1	1st	NCAA Division I first round
1978–79	Ted Owens	18–11	8–6	T–2nd	–
1979–80	Ted Owens	15–14	7–7	T–4th	–
1980–81	Ted Owens	24–8	9–5	T–2nd	NCAA Division I Sweet Sixteen
1981–82	Ted Owens	13–14	4–10	7th	–
1982–83	Ted Owens	13–16	4–10	T–6th	–
Ted Owens:		348–182	170–96		
Larry Brown (Big Eight Conference) (1983–1988)
1983–84	Larry Brown	22–10	9–5	2nd	NCAA Division I second round
1984–85	Larry Brown	26–8	11–3	2nd	NCAA Division I second round
1985–86	Larry Brown	35–4	13–1	1st	NCAA Division I Final Four
1986–87	Larry Brown	25–11	9–5	T–2nd	NCAA Division I Sweet Sixteen
1987–88	Larry Brown	27–11	9–5	3rd	NCAA Division I Champion
Larry Brown:		135–44	51–19		
Roy Williams (Big Eight Conference) (1989–1996)
1988–89	Roy Williams	19–12	6–8	6th	Ineligible
1989–90	Roy Williams	30–5	11–3	T–2nd	NCAA Division I second round
1990–91	Roy Williams	27–8	10–4	T–1st	NCAA Division I Runner-up
1991–92	Roy Williams	27–5	11–3	1st	NCAA Division I second round
1992–93	Roy Williams	29–7	11–3	1st	NCAA Division I Final Four
1993–94	Roy Williams	27–8	9–5	3rd	NCAA Division I Sweet Sixteen
1994–95	Roy Williams	25–6	11–3	1st	NCAA Division I Sweet Sixteen
1995–96	Roy Williams	29–5	12–2	1st	NCAA Division I Elite Eight
Roy Williams (Big 12 Conference) (1996–2003)
1996–97	Roy Williams	34–2	15–1	1st	NCAA Division I Sweet Sixteen
1997–98	Roy Williams	35–4	15–1	1st	NCAA Division I second round
1998–99	Roy Williams	23–10	11–5	T–2nd	NCAA Division I second round
1999–2000	Roy Williams	24–10	11–5	5th	NCAA Division I second round
2000–01	Roy Williams	26–7	12–4	T–2nd	NCAA Division I Sweet Sixteen
2001–02	Roy Williams	33–4	16–0	1st	NCAA Division I Final Four
2002–03	Roy Williams	30–8	14–2	1st	NCAA Division I Runner-up
Roy Williams:		418–101	175–49		
Bill Self (Big 12 Conference) (2003–present)
2003–04	Bill Self	24–9	12–4	T–2nd	NCAA Division I Elite Eight
2004–05	Bill Self	23–7	12–4	T–1st	NCAA Division I first round
2005–06	Bill Self	25–8	13–3	T–1st	NCAA Division I first round
2006–07	Bill Self	33–5	14–2	1st	NCAA Division I Elite Eight
2007–08	Bill Self	37–3	13–3	T–1st	NCAA Division I Champion
2008–09	Bill Self	27–8	14–2	1st	NCAA Division I Sweet Sixteen
2009–10	Bill Self	33–3	15–1	1st	NCAA Division I second round
2010–11	Bill Self	35–3	14–2	1st	NCAA Division I Elite Eight
2011–12	Bill Self	32–7	16–2	1st	NCAA Division I Runner-up
2012–13	Bill Self	31–6	14–4	T–1st	NCAA Division I Sweet Sixteen
2013–14	Bill Self	25–10	14–4	1st	NCAA Division I second round
2014–15	Bill Self	27–9	13–5	1st	NCAA Division I second round
2015–16	Bill Self	33–5	15–3	1st	NCAA Division I Elite Eight
2016–17	Bill Self	31–5	16–2	1st	NCAA Division I Elite Eight
2017–18	Bill Self	31–8	13–5	1st	NCAA Division I Final Four*
2018–19	Bill Self	26–10	12–6	3rd	NCAA Division I second round
2019–20	Bill Self	28–3	17–1	1st	No postseason held
2020–21	Bill Self	21–9	12–6	2nd	NCAA Division I second round
2021–22	Bill Self	34–6	14–4	T–1st	NCAA Division I Champion
2022–23	Norm Roberts; Bill Self	4–0^{[Note C]} 24–8	0–0; 13–5	1st	NCAA Division I second round
2023–24	Bill Self	23–11	10–8	T–5th	NCAA Division I second round
2024–25	Bill Self	21–13	11–9	6th	NCAA Division I first round
2025–26	Bill Self	24–11	12–6	T–3rd	NCAA Division I second round
Bill Self:		648–167	306–90		
Total:		2,453–920			
National champion Postseason invitational champion Conference regular season champion Conference regular season and conference tournament champion Division regular season champion Division regular season and conference tournament champion Conference tournament champion

Updated April 1, 2026

*In 2023, 11 regular season wins, the Jayhawks regular season Big 12 title, Big 12 Tournament championship, NCAA Tournament appearance, and Final Four appearance in the 2017–18 season were vacated by the NCAA due to recruiting violations.

== Notes ==
^A. In 1919, Karl Schlademan coached, and won, the first game of the season before relinquishing the coaching position to Allen in order to concentrate on his duties as head track coach.
^B. In 1947, Howard Engleman coached 14 games (going 8–6) after Allen was ordered to take a rest following the 13th game of the season. Engleman was never officially a head coach at the university.
^C. In November 2022, Bill Self served a four game suspension for recruiting violations. Norm Roberts was acting head coach during the suspension. Self also missed all 5 of the Jayhawks postseason games in March 2023 due to heart issues but received credit for the postseason victories.
