= 1917–18 Iowa State Cyclones men's basketball team =

American college basketball season

1917–18 Iowa State Cyclones men's basketball
- Conference: Missouri Valley Intercollegiate Athletic Association
- Record: 6–10 (1–6 MVIAA)
- Head coach: Harter Walter (3rd season)
- Home arena: State Gymnasium

1917–18 Missouri Valley Intercollegiate Athletic Association men's basketball standings
	Conf.				Overall
Team	W		L	PCT	W		L	PCT
Missouri	15	–	1	.938	17	–	1	.944
Kansas State	10	–	5	.667	12	–	5	.706
Kansas	9	–	8	.529	10	–	8	.556
Washington University	4	–	8	.333	9	–	8	.529
Nebraska	4	–	5	.444	7	–	7	.500
Iowa State	1	–	6	.143	6	–	10	.375
Drake	0	–	10	.000	1	–	15	.063

The 1917–18 Iowa State Cyclones men's basketball team (also known informally as Ames) represented Iowa State University during the 1917–18 NCAA men's basketball season. The Cyclones were coached by Harter Walter, who was in his third season with the Cyclones. They played their home games at the State Gymnasium in Ames, Iowa.

They finished the season 6–10, 1–6 in Missouri Valley play to finish in sixth place.

== Roster ==
1917–18 Iowa State Cyclones men's basketball team
Players
Coaches

Pos.	#	Name	Height	Weight	Year	Hometown
		F.H. Abbott	—	—
		Howard Aldrich (C)	—	—	Sr
		Anderson	—	—
		Baker	—	—
		A.M. Boyd	—	—
		Brotherlin	—	—
		Churchill	—	—
		Crouse	—	—
		Harry Hahn	—	—
		Handley	—	—
		Harper	—	—
		Hurwich	—	—
		Jager	—	—
		C Johnson	—	—
F		E.H. Levsen	—	—	Sr
		J.M. Linnan	—	—
		Marso	—	—
		Melham	—	—
		Maxwell Morgan (C)	—	—	Jr
		Morsch	—	—
		Mortimer	—	—
		Owen	—	—
		Powell	—	—
G		Allen Robinson	—	—
		Spiker	—	—
		Staly	—	—
		Templeton	—	—
		Vanderloo	—	—
		Wallace	—	—
		Wood	—	—

Head coach

- Harter Walter

Assistant coach(es)

Legend

- (C) Team captain
- (S) Suspended
- (I) Ineligible
- (W) Walk-on
- Injured
- Current redshirt

== Schedule and results ==
Date time, TV	Rank^{#}	Opponent^{#}	Result	Record	Site city, state
Regular season
December 15, 1917*		Camp Dodge	L 10–13	0–1	State Gymnasium; Ames, Iowa
December 18, 1917*		Simpson	W 23–17	1–1	State Gymnasium; Ames, Iowa
January 4, 1918*		Coe	W 29–19	2–1	State Gymnasium; Ames, Iowa
January 8, 1918*		Cornell	W 28–14	3–1	State Gymnasium; Ames, Iowa
January 12, 1918*		at Camp Dodge	L 18–31	3–2	Des Moines, Iowa
January 17, 1918		at Kansas	L 21–24	3–3 (0–1)	Robinson Gymnasium; Lawrence, Kansas
January 18, 1918		at Kansas	L 20–31	3–4 (0–2)	Robinson Gymnasium; Lawrence, Kansas
January 19, 1918		at Kansas State	L 27–33	3–5 (0–3)	Nichols Hall; Manhattan, Kansas
February 1, 1918*		at Grinnell	W 24–23	4–5	Grinnell, Iowa
February 5, 1918		Drake; Iowa Big Four	W 33–21	5–5 (1–3)	State Gymnasium; Ames, Iowa
February 9, 1918*		at Iowa; Cy-Hawk Rivalry	L 9–24	5–6	First Iowa Armory; Iowa City, Iowa
February 15, 1918		Missouri	L 11–26	5–7 (1–4)	State Gymnasium; Ames, Iowa
February 16, 1918		Missouri	L 13–24	5–8 (1–5)	State Gymnasium; Ames, Iowa
February 22, 1918*		Grinnell	W 24–17	6–8	State Gymnasium; Ames, Iowa
February 23, 1918		Kansas State	L 18–22	6–9 (1–6)	State Gymnasium; Ames, Iowa
March 1, 1918		Iowa; Cy-Hawk Rivalry	L 20–22	6–10	State Gymnasium; Ames, Iowa
*Non-conference game. ^{#}Rankings from AP poll. (#) Tournament seedings in parentheses. All times are in Central Time.
