= 1916–17 Iowa State Cyclones men's basketball team =

American college basketball season

1916–17 Iowa State Cyclones men's basketball
- Conference: Missouri Valley Intercollegiate Athletic Association
- Record: 12–6 (6–4 MVIAA)
- Head coach: Harter Walter (2nd season)
- Home arena: State Gymnasium

1916–17 Missouri Valley Intercollegiate Athletic Association men's basketball standings
	Conf.				Overall
Team	W		L	PCT	W		L	PCT
Kansas State	10	–	2	.833	15	–	2	.882
Missouri	10	–	4	.714	12	–	4	.750
Iowa State	6	–	4	.600	12	–	6	.667
Kansas	9	–	7	.563	12	–	6	.667
Nebraska	4	–	8	.333	12	–	10	.545
Washington University	1	–	11	.083	6	–	13	.316
Drake	0	–	4	.000	5	–	7	.417

The 1916–17 Iowa State Cyclones men's basketball team (also known informally as Ames) represented Iowa State University during the 1916–17 NCAA men's basketball season. The Cyclones were coached by Harter Walter, who was in his second season with the Cyclones. They played their home games at the State Gymnasium in Ames, Iowa.

They finished the season 12–6, 6–4 in Missouri Valley play to finish in third place.

== Roster ==
1916–17 Iowa State Cyclones men's basketball team
Players
Coaches

Pos.	#	Name	Height	Weight	Year	Hometown
		Aldrich	—	—
G		W.H. Boynton (C)	—	—	Sr
F		S.S. Bragdon	—	—	Sr
		Brotherlin	—	—
C		C.W. Erskine	—	—	So	Ottumwa, Iowa
		Frost	—	—
		Harry Hahn	—	—
		Harper	—	—
		Hubbard	—	—
C		L. Janda	—	—	Jr
		Kimler	—	—
		Linnane	—	—
		Meadows	—	—
G		Morgan	—	—	Jr
C		Roscoe Packer	—	—	Sr	Marshalltown, Iowa
F		J.W. Paige	—	—	So
		Tomlinson	—	—
		Wolrad	—	—
F		Woodward	—	—

Head coach

- Harter Walter

Assistant coach(es)

Legend

- (C) Team captain
- (S) Suspended
- (I) Ineligible
- (W) Walk-on
- Injured
- Current redshirt

== Schedule and results ==
Date time, TV	Rank^{#}	Opponent^{#}	Result	Record	Site city, state
Regular season
December 16, 1916*		Central	W 32–19	1–0	State Gymnasium; Ames, Iowa
January 2, 1917*		Simpson	L 13–18	1–1	State Gymnasium; Ames, Iowa
January 6, 1917*		Iowa State Teachers; Iowa Big Four	W 22–15	2–1	State Gymnasium; Ames, Iowa
January 12, 1917		at Missouri	L 25–28	2–2 (0–1)	Rothwell Gymnasium; Columbia, Missouri
January 13, 1917		at Missouri	W 22–21	3–2 (1–1)	Rothwell Gymnasium; Columbia, Missouri
January 18, 1917		Kansas	L 13–30	3–3 (1–2)	State Gymnasium; Ames, Iowa
January 19, 1917		Kansas	L 9–25	3–4 (1–3)	State Gymnasium; Ames, Iowa
January 26, 1917; 4:00 pm		at Drake; Iowa Big Four	W 25–21	4–4 (2–3)	Alumni Gymnasium; Des Moines, Iowa
February 6, 1917*		at Grinnell	W 18–8	5–4	Grinnell, Iowa
February 10, 1917*		Chicago	W 27–20	6–4	State Gymnasium (2,500); Ames, Iowa
February 13, 1917		Drake; Iowa Big Four	W 25–9	7–4 (3–3)	State Gymnasium; Ames, Iowa
February 16, 1917*		Iowa; CyHawk Rivalry	W 24–12	8–4	State Gymnasium; Ames, Iowa
February 22, 1917		Nebraska	W 19–7	9–4 (4–3)	State Gymnasium; Ames, Iowa
February 23, 1917		Nebraska	W 24–17	10–4 (5–3)	State Gymnasium; Ames, Iowa
February 27, 1917*		at Iowa; CyHawk Rivalry	L 13–15	10–5	First Iowa Armory; Iowa City, Iowa
March 3, 1917*		Grinnell	W 25–19	11–5	State Gymnasium; Ames, Iowa
March 9, 1917		at Nebraska	W 24–22	12–5 (6–3)	Grant Memorial Hall; Lincoln, Nebraska
March 10, 1917		at Nebraska	L 21–24	12–6 (6–4)	Grant Memorial Hall; Lincoln, Nebraska
*Non-conference game. ^{#}Rankings from AP poll. (#) Tournament seedings in parentheses. All times are in Central Time.
