= 1919 NCAA Men's Basketball All-Americans =

- Awarded for: 1918–19 NCAA men's basketball season

The 1919 College Basketball All-American team, as chosen retroactively by the Helms Athletic Foundation. The player highlighted in gold was chosen as the Helms Foundation College Basketball Player of the Year retroactively in 1944.

Player	Team
Lance Farwell	Navy
Tony Hinkle	Chicago
Dutch Lonborg	Kansas
Leon Marcus	Syracuse
Dan McNichol	Penn
Arnold Oss	Minnesota
George Parrish	Virginia Tech
Erling Platou	Minnesota
Craig Ruby	Missouri
Andrew Stannard	Penn

== See also ==
- 1918–19 NCAA men's basketball season
