= 1918–19 Kansas Jayhawks men's basketball team =

American college basketball season

1918–19 Kansas Jayhawks men's basketball
- Conference: Missouri Valley Intercollegiate Athletic Association
- Record: 7–9 (5–9 MVIAA)
- Head coach: W.O. Hamilton (10th season)
- Captain: Kelsey Mathews
- Home arena: Robinson Gymnasium

1918–19 Missouri Valley Intercollegiate Athletic Association men's basketball standings
	Conf.				Overall
Team	W		L	PCT	W		L	PCT
Kansas State	10	–	2	.833	16	–	2	.889
Missouri	11	–	3	.786	14	–	3	.824
Nebraska	10	–	6	.625	10	–	6	.625
Grinnell	5	–	3	.625	6	–	5	.545
Kansas	5	–	9	.357	7	–	9	.438
Iowa State	3	–	8	.273	5	–	11	.313
Washington University	2	–	8	.200	9	–	9	.500
Drake	2	–	9	.182	10	–	18	.357

The 1918–19 Kansas Jayhawks men's basketball team represented the University of Kansas during the 1918–19 college men's basketball season. Future member of the Hall of Fame Dutch Lonborg was retroactively named an All-American by the Helms Foundation, making him the third Jayhawk to earn the honor.

== Roster ==
- Roy Bennett
- John Bunn
- Byron Frederick
- Marvin Harms
- Howard Laslett
- Arthur Lonborg
- Edward Mason
- Kelsey Mathews
- Howard Miller

== Schedule and results ==
Date time, TV	Rank^{#}	Opponent^{#}	Result	Record	Site city, state
January 17		at Iowa State	W 50–17	1-0 (1-0)	State Gymnasium; Ammes, IA
January 18		at Iowa State	L 28–29	1-1 (1-1)	State Gymnasium; Ames, IA
January 24*		Baker	W 33–30	2-1	Robinson Gymnasium; Lawrence, KS
January 31		Missouri; Border War	L 25–45	2-2 (1-2)	Robinson Gymnasium; Lawrence, KS
February 1		Missouri; Border War	L 15–37	2-3 (1-3)	Robinson Gymnasium; Lawrence, KS
February 6		at Kansas State; Sunflower Showdown	L 30–33	2-4 (1-4)	Nichols Hall; Manhattan, KS
February 7		at Kansas State; Sunflower Showdown	L 27–41	2-5 (1-5)	Nichols Hall; Manhattan, KS
February 12*		K.C. Poly	W 50–34	3-5	Robinson Gymnasium; Lawrence, KS
February 19		at Missouri; Border War	L 20–34	3-6 (1-6)	Rothwell Gymnasium; Columbia, MO
February 20		at Missouri; Border War	W 36–29	4-6 (2-6)	Rothwell Gymnasium; Columbia, MO
February 21		Washington University (MO)	W 35–31	5-6 (3-6)	Francis Gymnasium; St. Louis, MO
February 22		at Washington University (MO)	W 39–19	6-6 (4-6)	Francis Gymnasium; St. Louis, MO
February 27		Kansas State; Sunflower Showdown	L 22–37	6-7 (4-7)	Robinson Gymnasium; Lawrence, KS
February 28		Kansas State; Sunflower Showdown	L 18–31	6-8 (4-8)	Robinson Gymnasium; Lawrence, KS
March 5		Nebraska	W 31–17	7-8 (5-8)	Robinson Gymnasium; Lawrence, KS
March 6		Nebraska	L 24–29	7-9 (5-9)	Robinson Gymnasium; Lawrence, KS
*Non-conference game. ^{#}Rankings from AP Poll. (#) Tournament seedings in parentheses.
