= 1919–20 Iowa State Cyclones men's basketball team =

American college basketball season

1919–20 Iowa State Cyclones men's basketball
- Conference: Missouri Valley Intercollegiate Athletic Association
- Record: 6–12 (2–10 MVIAA)
- Head coach: R.N. Berryman (1st season)
- Home arena: State Gymnasium

1919–20 Missouri Valley Intercollegiate Athletic Association men's basketball standings
	Conf.				Overall
Team	W		L	PCT	W		L	PCT
Missouri	17	–	1	.944	17	–	1	.944
Washington University	11	–	5	.688	13	–	5	.722
Kansas	9	–	7	.563	11	–	7	.611
Kansas State	8	–	8	.500	10	–	8	.556
Oklahoma	3	–	7	.300	9	–	7	.563
Drake	3	–	7	.300	12	–	11	.522
Iowa State	2	–	10	.167	6	–	12	.333
Grinnell	1	–	9	.100	4	–	10	.286

The 1919–20 Iowa State Cyclones men's basketball team (also known informally as Ames) represented Iowa State University during the 1919–20 NCAA men's basketball season. The Cyclones were coached by R.N. Berryman, who was in his first and only season with the Cyclones. They played their home games at the State Gymnasium in Ames, Iowa.

They finished the season 6–12, 2–10 in Missouri Valley play to finish in seventh place.

== Roster ==
1919–20 Iowa State Cyclones men's basketball team
Players
Coaches

Pos.	#	Name	Height	Weight	Year	Hometown
C		Anderson	—	—
		M.A. "Shorty" Boyd	—	—
F		Jack Currie	—	—
		Clyde Erskine	—	—
		Hibbs	—	—
G		G.F. Hudson	—	—	So
C		M.N. Innes	—	—	So	Ames, Iowa
F		Janda	—	—
		W.L. "Red" Lane	—	—	So
		Bob Miller	—	—
		"Boob" Miller	—	—
F		Bill Paige	—	—
		Schooley	—	—
F		Harry Shepard	—	—	Sr
F		Tracy	—	—
G		Stewart White (C)	—	—
G		F.W. Willimack	—	—	Sr
F		Wright	—	—
		Young	—	—

Head coach

- R.N. Berryman

Assistant coach(es)

Legend

- (C) Team captain
- (S) Suspended
- (I) Ineligible
- (W) Walk-on
- Injured
- Current redshirt

== Schedule and results ==
Date time, TV	Rank^{#}	Opponent^{#}	Result	Record	Site city, state
Regular season
January 6, 1920*		Coe	W 23–13	1–0	State Gymnasium; Ames, Iowa
January 9, 1920		Missouri	L 20–55	1–1 (0–1)	State Gymnasium; Ames, Iowa
January 10, 1920		Missouri	L 17–45	1–2 (0–2)	State Gymnasium; Ames, Iowa
January 16, 1920		at Kansas	L 27–29	1–3 (0–3)	Robinson Gymnasium; Lawrence, Kansas
January 17, 1920		at Kansas	L 18–28	1–4 (0–4)	Robinson Gymnasium; Lawrence, Kansas
January 19, 1920*		Iowa State Teachers (Northern Iowa); Iowa Big Four	W 28–19	2–4	State Gymnasium; Ames, Iowa
January 23, 1920*		at Iowa; Iowa Big Four	L 15–27	2–4	First Iowa Armory; Iowa City, Iowa
January 28, 1920		Washington University (MO)	L 30–35	2–5 (0–5)	State Gymnasium; Ames, Iowa
January 29, 1920		Washington University (MO)	L 17–33	2–6 (0–6)	State Gymnasium; Ames, Iowa
January 31, 1920*; 2:00 pm		Simpson	W 30–21	3–6	State Gymnasium; Ames, Iowa
February 13, 1920		at Kansas State	L 20–37	3–7 (0–7)	Nichols Hall; Manhattan, Kansas
February 14, 1920		at Kansas State	L 21–27	3–7 (0–8)	Nichols Hall; Manhattan, Kansas
February 18, 1920		Drake; Iowa Big Four	L 19–22	3–8 (0–9)	State Gymnasium; Ames, Iowa
February 20, 1920		at Grinnell	L 12–13	3–9 (0–10)	Grinnell, Iowa
February 23, 1920*		Cornell	W 26–14	4–9	State Gymnasium; Ames, Iowa
February 28, 1920; 2:00 pm		Grinnell	W 35–27	5–9 (1–10)	State Gymnasium; Ames, Iowa
March 1, 1920		at Drake; Iowa Big Four	W 36–23	6–9 (2–10)	Des Moines Coliseum; Des Moines, Iowa
March 6, 1920*		Iowa; CyHawk Rivalry	L 19–26	6–10	State Gymnasium; Ames, Iowa
*Non-conference game. ^{#}Rankings from AP poll. (#) Tournament seedings in parentheses. All times are in Central Time.
