= 1918–19 Iowa State Cyclones men's basketball team =

American college basketball season

1918–19 Iowa State Cyclones men's basketball
- Conference: Missouri Valley Intercollegiate Athletic Association
- Record: 5–11 (3–8 MVIAA)
- Head coach: Harter Walter (4th season)
- Home arena: State Gymnasium

1918–19 Missouri Valley Intercollegiate Athletic Association men's basketball standings
	Conf.				Overall
Team	W		L	PCT	W		L	PCT
Kansas State	10	–	2	.833	16	–	2	.889
Missouri	11	–	3	.786	14	–	3	.824
Nebraska	10	–	6	.625	10	–	6	.625
Grinnell	5	–	3	.625	6	–	5	.545
Kansas	5	–	9	.357	7	–	9	.438
Iowa State	3	–	8	.273	5	–	11	.313
Washington University	2	–	8	.200	9	–	9	.500
Drake	2	–	9	.182	10	–	18	.357

The 1918–19 Iowa State Cyclones men's basketball team (also known informally as Ames) represented Iowa State University during the 1918–19 NCAA men's basketball season. The Cyclones were coached by Harter Walter, who was in his fourth and final season with the Cyclones. They played their home games at the State Gymnasium in Ames, Iowa. They defeated the 219th Signal Battalion of Camp Dodge on December 28, 1918, in a "practice game" by the score of 19 to 7. They were originally scheduled to host Coe on January 2, 1919, but it was postponed due to the influenza pandemic. Iowa State was originally scheduled to play Nebraska, but could not come to an agreement, claiming the Nebraska gymnasium was too small.

They finished the season 5–11, 3–8 in Missouri Valley play to finish in sixth place.

== Roster ==
1918–19 Iowa State Cyclones men's basketball team
Players
Coaches

Pos.	#	Name	Height	Weight	Year	Hometown
F		E.H. Levsen	—	—	Sr
		Mackay	—	—
G		Bob Miller	—	—	So	Waterloo, Iowa
F		R.W. "Boob" Miller	—	—	So	Waterloo, Iowa
G		Allen Robinson	—	—	Sr
F		Harry Shepard	—	—	So	Council Bluffs, Iowa
		W.F. Stecker	—	—
		Templeton	—	—
		Walpole	—	—
G		Stewart White	—	—	So
F		F.E. Willimack	—	—	So
		Young	—	—

Head coach

- Harter Walter

Assistant coach(es)

Legend

- (C) Team captain
- (S) Suspended
- (I) Ineligible
- (W) Walk-on
- Injured
- Current redshirt

== Schedule and results ==
Date time, TV	Rank^{#}	Opponent^{#}	Result	Record	Site city, state
Exhibition
December 28, 1918*		Camp Dodge 219th Signal Battalion; Exhibition	W 19–7		State Gymnasium; Ames, Iowa
Regular season
January 7, 1919*		at Simpson	W 21–15	1–0	Indianola, Iowa
January 10, 1919		at Missouri	L 16–34	1–1 (0–1)	Rothwell Gymnasium; Columbia, Missouri
January 11, 1919		at Missouri	L 22–35	1–2 (0–2)	Rothwell Gymnasium; Columbia, Missouri
January 17, 1919; 7:30 pm		Kansas	L 17–50	1–3 (0–3)	State Gymnasium; Ames, Iowa
January 18, 1919; 2:30 pm		Kansas	W 29–28	2–3 (1–3)	State Gymnasium; Ames, Iowa
January 24, 1919*		Camp Dodge	W 31–30	3–3	State Gymnasium; Ames, Iowa
January 28, 1919; 4:15 pm		Drake; Iowa Big Four	W 24–11	4–3 (2–3)	State Gymnasium; Ames, Iowa
January 31, 1919*		Coe	L 20–31	4–4	State Gymnasium; Ames, Iowa
February 4, 1919; 4:30 pm		Washington University (MO)	L 19–25	4–5 (2–4)	State Gymnasium; Ames, Iowa
February 11, 1919		Kansas State	L 18–22	4–6 (2–5)	State Gymnasium; Ames, Iowa
February 12, 1919		Kansas State	L 17–27	4–7 (2–6)	State Gymnasium; Ames, Iowa
February 15, 1919*		at Iowa; Cy-Hawk Rivalry	L 17–27	4–8	First Iowa Armory; Iowa City, Iowa
February 18, 1919		at Drake; Iowa Big Four	L 21–27	4–9 (2–7)	Alumni Gymnasium; Des Moines, Iowa
February 22, 1919		at Grinnell	L 20–25	4–10 (2–8)	Grinnell, Iowa
March 1, 1919*		Iowa; Cy-Hawk Rivalry	L 20–28	4–11	State Gymnasium; Ames, Iowa
March 7, 1919		Grinnell	W 25–22	5–11 (3–8)	State Gymnasium; Ames, Iowa
*Non-conference game. ^{#}Rankings from AP poll. (#) Tournament seedings in parentheses. All times are in Central Time.
