= 1910–11 Iowa State Cyclones men's basketball team =

American college basketball season

1910–11 Iowa State Cyclones men's basketball
- Conference: Missouri Valley Intercollegiate Athletic Association
- Record: 6–11 (6–8 MVIAA)
- Head coach: Clyde Williams (4th season)
- Assistant coach: Homer Hubbard
- Home arena: Margaret Hall Gymnasium

1910–11 Missouri Valley Intercollegiate Athletic Association men's basketball standings
	Conf.				Overall
Team	W		L	PCT	W		L	PCT
Kansas	9	–	3	.750	12	–	6	.667
Nebraska	7	–	5	.583	11	–	7	.611
Iowa State	6	–	8	.429	6	–	11	.353
Missouri	4	–	8	.333	4	–	8	.333
Drake	0	–	2	.000	0	–	6	.000

The 1910–11 Iowa State Cyclones men's basketball team (also known informally as Ames) represented Iowa State University during the 1910–11 NCAA men's basketball season. The Cyclones were coached by Clyde Williams, in his fourth season with the Cyclones. The Cyclones played their home games at the Margaret Hall Gymnasium in Ames, Iowa.

They finished the season 6–11, 6–8 in Missouri Valley play to finish in third place in the North division.

== Roster ==
1910–11 Iowa State Cyclones men's basketball team
Players
Coaches

Pos.	#	Name	Height	Weight	Year	Hometown
G		Earl Bisbee	—	—		Oak Park, Illinois
F		Harry Brown	—	—	So	Sioux City, Iowa
F		Joe Brown	—	—	Sr	Sioux City, Iowa
G		Allie Chappel	—	—		West Des Moines, Iowa
F		J.C. Kerrigan	—	—		Davenport, Iowa
		Clark Mosher (C)	—	—	Sr
C		Hans Pfund	—	—		Des Moines, Iowa
C		Edward Te Veltrup	—	—		Sioux City, Iowa
G		Robert Walker	—	—		Des Moines, Iowa
F		Albert Weiss	—	—	Sr	Denison, Iowa

Head coach

- Clyde Williams

Assistant coach(es)

- Homer Hubbard

Legend

- (C) Team captain
- (S) Suspended
- (I) Ineligible
- (W) Walk-on
- Injured
- Current redshirt

== Schedule and results ==
Date time, TV	Rank^{#}	Opponent^{#}	Result	Record	Site city, state
Regular season
January 13, 1911		at Missouri	L 22–40	0–1 (0–1)	Rothwell Gymnasium; Columbia, Missouri
January 14, 1911		at Missouri	L 26–43	0–2 (0–2)	Rothwell Gymnasium; Columbia, Missouri
January 16, 1911		at Kansas	L 21–41	0–3 (0–3)	Robinson Gymnasium; Lawrence, Kansas
January 17, 1911		at Kansas	L 18–54	0–4 (0–4)	Robinson Gymnasium; Lawrence, Kansas
January 18, 1911*		at Nebraska Wesleyan	L 24–33	0–5	Lincoln, Nebraska
January 20, 1911		at Nebraska	L 20–41	0–6 (0–5)	Grant Memorial Hall; Lincoln, Nebraska
January 21, 1911		at Nebraska	W 33–31	1–6 (1–5)	Grant Memorial Hall; Lincoln, Nebraska
January 28, 1911*		Grinnell	L 19–33	1–7	Margaret Hall Gymnasium; Ames, Iowa
February 4, 1911		Drake; Iowa Big Four	W 47–23	2–7 (2–5)	Margaret Hall Gymnasium; Ames, Iowa
February 6, 1911		Nebraska	W 31–27	3–7 (3–5)	Margaret Hall Gymnasium; Ames, Iowa
February 7, 1911		Nebraska	L 19–22	3–8 (3–6)	Margaret Hall Gymnasium; Ames, Iowa
February 10, 1911; 4:00 pm		at Drake; Iowa Big Four	W 23–19	4–8 (4–6)	Alumni Gymnasium; Des Moines, Iowa
February 11, 1911*		at Grinnell	L 26–41	4–9	Grinnell, Iowa
February 20, 1911		Kansas	L 36–37 ^{OT}	4–10 (4–7)	Margaret Hall Gymnasium; Ames, Iowa
February 21, 1911		Kansas	L 17–28	4–11 (4–8)	Margaret Hall Gymnasium; Ames, Iowa
February 24, 1911		Missouri	W 22–16	5–11 (5–8)	Margaret Hall Gymnasium; Ames, Iowa
February 25, 1911		Missouri	W 21–18	6–11 (6–8)	Margaret Hall Gymnasium; Ames, Iowa
*Non-conference game. ^{#}Rankings from AP poll. (#) Tournament seedings in parentheses. All times are in Central Time.
