= 1919–20 Kansas Jayhawks men's basketball team =

American college basketball season

1919–20 Kansas Jayhawks men's basketball
- Conference: Missouri Valley Intercollegiate Athletic Association
- Record: 11–7 (9–7 MVIAA)
- Head coach: Phog Allen (3rd season)
- Captain: Arthur Lonborg
- Home arena: Robinson Gymnasium

1919–20 Missouri Valley Intercollegiate Athletic Association men's basketball standings
	Conf.				Overall
Team	W		L	PCT	W		L	PCT
Missouri	17	–	1	.944	17	–	1	.944
Washington University	11	–	5	.688	13	–	5	.722
Kansas	9	–	7	.563	11	–	7	.611
Kansas State	8	–	8	.500	10	–	8	.556
Oklahoma	3	–	7	.300	9	–	7	.563
Drake	3	–	7	.300	12	–	11	.522
Iowa State	2	–	10	.167	6	–	12	.333
Grinnell	1	–	9	.100	4	–	10	.286

The 1919–20 Kansas Jayhawks men's basketball team represented the University of Kansas during the 1919–20 college men's basketball season.

== Roster ==
- Roy Bennett
- John Bunn
- Marvin Harms
- Arthur Lonborg
- Howard Miller
- Herbert Olson
- George Rody
- Ernst Uhrlaub

== Schedule and results ==
Date time, TV	Rank^{#}	Opponent^{#}	Result	Record	Site city, state
January 6*		Emporia State	W 37–22	1-0	Robinson Gymnasium; Lawrence, KS
January 8*		Washburn	W 50–40	2-0	Robinson Gymnasium; Lawrence, KS
January 16		Iowa State	W 29–27	3-0 (1-0)	Robinson Gymnasium; Lawrence, KS
January 17		Iowa State	W 28–18	4-0 (2-0)	Robinson Gymnasium; Lawrence, KS
January 22		Missouri; Border War	L 27–32	4-1 (2-1)	Robinson Gymnasium; Lawrence, KS
January 23		Missouri; Border War	L 16–38	4-2 (2-2)	Robinson Gymnasium; Lawrence, KS
February 6		at Kansas State; Sunflower Showdown	W 33–18	5-2 (3-2)	Nichols Hall; Manhattan, KS
February 7		at Kansas State; Sunflower Showdown	L 12–26	5-3 (3-3)	Nichols Hall; Manhattan, KS
February 13		Grinnell	W 42–11	6-3 (4-3)	Grinnell, IA
February 14		Drake	W 37–18	7-3 (5-3)	Des Moines Coliseum; Des Moines, IA
February 18		at Missouri; Border War	L 21–36	7-4 (5-4)	Rothwell Gymnasium; Columbia, MO
February 19		at Missouri; Border War	L 13–31	7-5 (5-5)	Rothwell Gymnasium; Columbia, MO
February 20		at Washington University (MO)	L 27–28	7-6 (5-6)	Francis Gymnasium; St. Louis, MO
February 21		at Washington University (MO)	L 35–37	7-7 (5-7)	Francis Gymnasium; St. Louis, MO
March 5		Oklahoma	W 33–28	8-7 (6-7)	Robinson Gymnasium; Lawrence, KS
March 6		Oklahoma	W 42–26	9-7 (7-7)	Robinson Gymnasium; Lawrence, KS
March 9		Kansas State; Sunflower Showdown	W 30–24	10-7 (8-7)	Robinson Gymnasium; Lawrence, KS
March 10		Kansas State; Sunflower Showdown	W 31–23	11-7 (9-7)	Robinson Gymnasium; Lawrence, KS
*Non-conference game. ^{#}Rankings from AP Poll. (#) Tournament seedings in parentheses.
