= 1916–17 Kansas Jayhawks men's basketball team =

American college basketball season

1916–17 Kansas Jayhawks men's basketball
- Conference: Missouri Valley Intercollegiate Athletic Association
- Record: 12–8 (9–7 MVIAA)
- Head coach: W. O. Hamilton (8th season)
- Captain: Lawrence Nelson
- Home arena: Robinson Gymnasium

The 1916–17 Kansas Jayhawks men's basketball team represented the University of Kansas during the 1916–17 college men's basketball season.

== Roster ==
- Leon Gibbens
- Walter Kauder
- Howard Laslett
- Adrian Lindsey
- Harold Lytle
- Lawrence Nelson
- Rudolf Uhrlaub
- Ernst Uhrlaub
- Ivan Wilson
- George Woodward

== Schedule and results ==
Date time, TV	Rank^{#}	Opponent^{#}	Result	Record	Site city, state
January 10*		Washburn	W 55–9	1-0	Robinson Gymnasium; Lawrence, KS
January 12		Emporia State	W 36–27	2-0	Robinson Gymnasium; Lawrence, KS
January 18		at Iowa State	W 30–13	3-0 (1-0)	State Gymnasium; Ames, IA
January 19		at Iowa State	W 25–9	4-0 (2-0)	State Gymnasium; Ames, IA
January 20*		at K.C. Poly	W 45–22	5-0	Convention Hall; Kansas City, MO
January 23		Kansas State; Sunflower Showdown	W 34–16	6-0 (3-0)	Robinson Gymnasium; Lawrence, KS
January 24		Kansas State; Sunflower Showdown	W 27–19	7-0 (4-0)	Robinson Gymnasium; Lawrence, KS
February 2		at Kansas State; Sunflower Showdown	L 9–38	7-1 (4-1)	Nichols Hall; Manhattan, KS
February 3		at Kansas State; Sunflower Showdown	L 29–32	7-2 (4-2)	Nichols Hall; Manhattan, KS
February 6		Missouri; Border War	W 24–23	8-2 (5-2)	Robinson Gymnasium; Lawrence, KS
February 7		Missouri; Border War	L 17–26	8-3 (5-3)	Robinson Gymnasium; Lawrence, KS
February 12		Washington University (MO)	W 34–26	9-3 (6-3)	Robinson Gymnasium; Lawrence, KS
February 13		Washington University (MO)	W 33–25	10-3 (7-3)	Robinson Gymnasium; Lawrence, KS
February 16		Nebraska	L 19–21	10-4 (7-4)	Robinson Gymnasium; Lawrence, KS
February 17		Nebraska	W 30–10	11-4 (8-4)	Robinson Gymnasium; Lawrence, KS
February 21		at Missouri; Border War	L 20–24	11-5 (8-5)	Rothwell Gymnasium; Columbia, MO
February 22		at Missouri; Border War	L 15–38	11-6 (8-6)	Rothwell Gymnasium; Columbia, MO
February 23		at Washington University (MO)	L 16–24	11-7 (8-7)	Francis Gymnasium; St. Louis, MO
February 24		at Washington University (MO)	W 29–19	12-7 (9-7)	Francis Gymnasium; St. Louis, MO
February 25		vs. Kansas All Stars	L 20–26	12-8	Site Unknown
*Non-conference game. ^{#}Rankings from AP Poll. (#) Tournament seedings in parentheses.
