= 1917–18 Kansas Jayhawks men's basketball team =

American college basketball season

1917–18 Kansas Jayhawks men's basketball
- Conference: Missouri Valley Intercollegiate Athletic Association
- Record: 10–8 (9–8 MVIAA)
- Head coach: W.O. Hamilton (9th season)
- Captain: Rudolf Uhrlaub
- Home arena: Robinson Gymnasium

The 1917–18 Kansas Jayhawks men's basketball team represented the University of Kansas during the 1917–18 college men's basketball season.

== Roster ==
- John Bunn
- James Knoles
- Arthur Lonborg
- Frank Mandeville
- Kelsey Mathews
- Howard Miller
- Carl Rice
- Rudolf Uhrlaub

== Schedule and results ==
Date time, TV	Rank^{#}	Opponent^{#}	Result	Record	Site city, state
January 10*		Camp Funston	W 37–27	1-0	Robinson Gymnasium; Lawrence, KS
January 17		Iowa State	W 24–21	2-0 (1-0)	Robinson Gymnasium; Lawrence, KS
January 18		Iowa State	W 31–20	3-0 (2-0)	Robinson Gymnasium; Lawrence, KS
January 25		Drake	W 61–24	4-0 (3-0)	Robinson Gymnasium; Lawrence, KS
January 30		Kansas State; Sunflower Showdown	L 23–36	4-1 (3-1)	Robinson Gymnasium; Lawrence, KS
January 31		Kansas State; Sunflower Showdown	W 35–32	5-1 (4-1)	Robinson Gymnasium; Lawrence, KS
February 4		Missouri; Border War	L 22–36	5-2 (4-2)	Robinson Gymnasium; Lawrence, KS
February 5		Missouri; Border War	L 21–25	5-3 (4-3)	Robinson Gymnasium; Lawrence, KS
February 11		Washington University (MO)	W 51–22	6-3 (5-3)	Robinson Gymnasium; Lawrence, KS
February 12		Washington University (MO)	W 50–25	7-3 (6-3)	Robinson Gymnasium; Lawrence, KS
February 15		at Nebraska	L 23–24	7-4 (6-4)	Grant Memorial Hall; Lincoln, NE
February 16		at Nebraska	W 31–25	8-4 (7-4)	Grant Memorial Hall; Lincoln, NE
February 20		at Missouri; Border War	L 21–39	8-5 (7-5)	Rothwell Gymnasium; Columbia, MO
February 21		at Missouri; Border War	W 28–23	9-5 (8-5)	Rothwell Gymnasium; Columbia, MO
February 22		at Washington University (MO)	L 23–47	9-6 (8-6)	Francis Gymnasium; St. Louis, MO
February 23		at Washington University (MO)	L 18–32	9-7 (8-7)	Francis Gymnasium; St. Louis, MO
March 4		at Kansas State; Sunflower Showdown	W 35–33	10-7 (9-7)	Nichols Hall; Manhattan, KS
March 5		at Kansas State; Sunflower Showdown	L 25–32	10-8 (9-8)	Nichols Hall; Manhattan, KS
*Non-conference game. ^{#}Rankings from AP Poll. (#) Tournament seedings in parentheses.
