= George Parrish =

George Parrish may refer to:

- George Parrish (composer) (1901–1982), American composer
- George Parrish (racing driver) (1928–2016)
- George F. Parrish (1897–1971), American college athlete, coach and politician
