= 1910–11 Kansas Jayhawks men's basketball team =

American college basketball season

1910–11 Kansas Jayhawks men's basketball

MVIAA Champions
- Conference: MVIAA
- Record: 12–6 (9–3 MVIAA)
- Head coach: W.O. Hamilton (2nd season)
- Captain: Robert Heizer
- Home arena: Robinson Gymnasium

1910–11 Missouri Valley Intercollegiate Athletic Association men's basketball standings
	Conf.				Overall
Team	W		L	PCT	W		L	PCT
Kansas	9	–	3	.750	12	–	6	.667
Nebraska	7	–	5	.583	11	–	7	.611
Iowa State	6	–	8	.429	6	–	11	.353
Missouri	4	–	8	.333	4	–	8	.333
Drake	0	–	2	.000	0	–	6	.000

The 1910–11 Kansas Jayhawks men's basketball team represented the University of Kansas during the 1910–11 NCAA men's basketball season, which was their 13th season. The Jayhawks, members of the MVIAA, were coached by W. O. Hamilton who was in his second year as head coach. The Jayhawks won their fourth consecutive MVIAA Championship and finished the season 12–6.

== Roster ==
- Donald Dousman
- Robert Heizer
- Thomas Johnson
- Harold Larson
- Verne Long
- George Stuckey

== Schedule and results ==
This schedule is incomplete.

Date time, TV	Rank^{#}	Opponent^{#}	Result	Record	Site city, state
January 13*		Baker	W 40–17	1-0	Robinson Gymnasium; Lawrence, KS
January 16		Iowa State	W 41–21	2-0 (1-0)	Robinson Gymnasium; Lawrence, KS
January 17		Iowa State	W 54–18	3-0 (2-0)	Robinson Gymnasium; Lawrence, KS
January 20*		at Baker	W 27–21	4-0	Baldwin, KS
January 28		Missouri; Border War	W 34–28	5-0 (3-0)	Robinson Gymnasium; Lawrence, KS
January 29		Missouri; Border War	W 27–14	6-0 (4-0)	Robinson Gymnasium; Lawrence, KS
February 4*		Kansas City AC	W 36–29	7-0	Robinson Gymnasium; Lawrence, KS
February 10		Nebraska	L 27–36	7-1 (4-1)	Robinson Gymnasium; Lawrence, KS
February 11		Nebraska	W 37–12	8-1 (5-1)	Robinson Gymnasium; Lawrence, KS
February 16*		at Kansas City AC	L 40–41	8-2	Club House; Kansas City, MO
February 17		at Missouri; Border War	W 32–16	9-2 (6-1)	Rothwell Gymnasium; Columbia, MO
February 18		at Missouri; Border War	W 36–25	10-2 (7-1)	Rothwell Gymnasium; Columbia, MO
February 20		at Iowa State	W 37–36	11-2 (8-1)	Ames, IA
February 21		at Iowa State	W 28–17	12-2 (9-1)	Ames, IA
February 22*		at Grinnell	L 16–17	12-3	Grinnell, IA
February 23*		at Cotner	L 26–35	12-4	Colner, NE
February 24		at Nebraska	L 26–38	12-5 (9-2)	Grant Memorial Hall; Lincoln, NE
February 25		at Nebraska	L 24–36	12-6 (9-3)	Grant Memorial Hall; Lincoln, NE
*Non-conference game. ^{#}Rankings from AP Poll. (#) Tournament seedings in parentheses.
