= W. O. Hamilton =

American basketball coach (1876–1951)

Biographical details
- Born: March 29, 1876; Huntsville, Missouri, U.S.
- Died: December 29, 1951 (aged 75); Lawrence, Kansas, U.S.
- Education: William Jewell College

Coaching career (HC unless noted)

Basketball
- 1898–1899: William Jewell
- 1906–1908: William Jewell
- 1909–1919: Kansas

Track and field
- 1909–1918: Kansas

Administrative career (AD unless noted)
- 1911–1919: Kansas

Head coaching record
- Overall: 142–73 (basketball)

Accomplishments and honors

Championships
- Basketball; 5 MVIAA (1910–1912, 1914–1915)

William Oliver Hamilton (March 29, 1876 – December 29, 1951) was an American basketball coach, track coach, and college athletics administrator. He served as the third head basketball coach at the University of Kansas, coaching the Jayhawks from 1909 to 1919. Under Hamilton Kansas had its first All-Americans Tommy Johnson (1909), Ralph Sproull (1915), and Dutch Lonborg (1919) who would later be a member of the Basketball Hall of Fame. Before coaching at Kansas, Hamilton was the coach at Central High School in Kansas City at the time Casey Stengel future member of the Baseball Hall of Fame was attending and played basketball as well as baseball. His basketball team won the city championship.

Hamilton later worked as a car dealer in Lawrence, Kansas. He died there of December 29, 1951 at the age of 75.

== Head coaching record ==
=== Basketball ===
Record table
Season	Team	Overall	Conference	Standing	Postseason
William Jewell Cardinals (Independent) (1898–1899)
1898–99	William Jewell	1–2			
William Jewell Cardinals (Independent) (1906–1908)
1906–07	William Jewell	4–5			
1907–08	William Jewell	12–6			
William Jewell:		17–13			
Kansas Jayhawks (Missouri Valley Intercollegiate Athletic Association) (1909–1919)
1909–10	Kansas	18–1	7–1	1st	
1910–11	Kansas	12–6	9–3	1st	
1911–12	Kansas	11–7	6–2	1st	
1912–13	Kansas	16–6	7–3	2nd	
1913–14	Kansas	17–1	13–1	1st	
1914–15	Kansas	16–1	13–1	1st	
1915-16	Kansas	6–12	5–11	4th	
1916-17	Kansas	12–8	9–7	4th	
1917-18	Kansas	10–8	9–8	3rd	
1918–19	Kansas	7–9	5–9	5th	
Kansas:		125–59	83–46		
Total:		142–72			
National champion Postseason invitational champion Conference regular season champion Conference regular season and conference tournament champion Division regular season champion Division regular season and conference tournament champion Conference tournament champion
