= 1911–12 Kansas Jayhawks men's basketball team =

American college basketball season

1911–12 Kansas Jayhawks men's basketball

MVIAA Co-Champions
- Conference: MVIAA
- Record: 11–7 (6–2 MVIAA)
- Head coach: W.O. Hamilton (3rd season)
- Captain: George Stuckey
- Home arena: Robinson Gymnasium

The 1911–12 Kansas Jayhawks men's basketball team represented the University of Kansas during the 1911–12 college men's basketball season, which was their 14th season. They were coached by W. O. Hamilton who was in his 3rd year as head coach. They were members of the MVIAA. They won their fifth consecutive conference championship after finishing the season 11–7.

== Roster ==
- Walter Boehm
- Loren Brown
- Donald Dousman
- Charles Greenless
- Ora Hite
- George Stuckey

== Schedule and results ==
This schedule is incomplete.

Date time, TV	Rank^{#}	Opponent^{#}	Result	Record	Site city, state
January 17*		Baker	W 45–18	1-0	Robinson Gymnasium; Lawrence, KS
January 19		Nebraska	L 26–30	1-1	Robinson Gymnasium; Lawrence, KS
January 20		Nebraska	L 27–30	1-2	Robinson Gymnasium; Lawrence, KS
January 26*		Kansas City AC	W 43–15	2-2	Robinson Gymnasium; Lawrence, KS
January 27*		Kansas State; Sunflower Showdown	W 37–24	3-2	Robinson Gymnasium; Lawrence, KS
February 1*		at Kansas City AC	W 31–25	4-2	Club House; Kansas City, MO
February 6		at Baker	W 34–13	5-2	Baldwin, KS
February 9		Missouri; Border War	W 27–16	6-2 (1-0)	Robinson Gymnasium; Lawrence, KS
February 10		Missouri; Border War	W 31–21	7-2 (2-0)	Robinson Gymnasium; Lawrence, KS
February 16		Washington University (MO)	W 43–16	8-2 (3-0)	Robinson Gymnasium; Lawrence, KS
February 17		Washington University (MO)	W 30–22	9-2 (4-0)	Robinson Gymnasium; Lawrence, KS
February 21		at Missouri; Border War	W 39–24	10-2 (5-0)	Rothwell Gymnasium; Columbia, MO
February 22		at Missouri; Border War	W 32–26	11-2 (6-0)	Rothwell Gymnasium; Columbia, MO
February 23		Washington University (MO)	L 18–26	11-3 (6-1)	Francis Gymnasium; St. Louis, MO
February 24		at Washington University (MO)	L 28–32	11-4 (6-2)	Francis Gymnasium; St. Louis, MO
February 29*		at Kansas State; Sunflower Showdown	L 28–33	11-5	Nichols Hall; Manhattan, KS
March 1		at Nebraska	L 21–49	11-6	Grant Memorial Hall; Lincoln, NE
March 2		at Nebraska	L 28–29	11-7	Grant Memorial Hall; Lincoln, NE
*Non-conference game. ^{#}Rankings from AP Poll. (#) Tournament seedings in parentheses.
