= 1910–11 Drake Bulldogs men's basketball team =

American college basketball season

1910–11 Drake Bulldogs men's basketball
- Conference: Missouri Valley Intercollegiate Athletic Association
- Record: 0–6 (0–2 MVIAA)
- Head coach: A. R. Hackett

1910–11 Missouri Valley Intercollegiate Athletic Association men's basketball standings
	Conf.				Overall
Team	W		L	PCT	W		L	PCT
Kansas	9	–	3	.750	12	–	6	.667
Nebraska	7	–	5	.583	11	–	7	.611
Iowa State	6	–	8	.429	6	–	11	.353
Missouri	4	–	8	.333	4	–	8	.333
Drake	0	–	2	.000	0	–	6	.000

The 1910–11 Drake Bulldogs men's basketball team represented Drake University in the 1910–11 college basketball season. The team was led by first-year head coach A. R. Hackett. They finished with a 0–12 (0–8 Missouri Valley Intercollegiate Athletic Association (MVIAA)) record the previous season. That had them placing third out of three teams in the MVIAA North Division. During the 1910–11 school year Washington St. Louis did not field a team, so the MVIAA did not sponsor divisions for this school year.

== Schedule ==
Missouri Valley Intercollegiate Athletic Association standing: 5th
Date	Opponent*	Location	Time^{#}	Result	Overall	Conference
**Regular season games**
January 11, 1911	Grinnell College	Away		L 17–38	0–1	
January 21, 1911	Iowa	Away		L 20–30	0–2	
January 24, 1911	Grinnell College	Home		L 14–30	0–3	
February 4, 1911	**Iowa State College**	Away		L 23–47	0–4	0–1
February 10, 1911	**Iowa State College**	Home		L 19–23	0–5	0–2
February 23, 1911	Iowa	Home		L 15–21	0–6	0–2
All times are in EST. Conference games in **bold**.
