= 1918–19 Indiana Hoosiers men's basketball team =

American college basketball season

1918–19 Indiana Hoosiers men's basketball
- Conference: Big Ten Conference
- Record: 10–7 (4–6 Big Ten)
- Head coach: Dana Evans (2nd season)
- Captain: Ardith Phillips
- Home arena: Men's Gymnasium

1918–19 Big Ten Conference men's basketball standings
	Conf.				Overall
Team	W		L	PCT	W		L	PCT
Minnesota	10	–	0	1.000	13	–	0	1.000
Chicago	10	–	2	.833	21	–	6	.778
Northwestern	6	–	4	.600	6	–	6	.500
Michigan	5	–	5	.500	18	–	6	.750
Illinois	5	–	7	.417	6	–	8	.429
Indiana	4	–	6	.400	10	–	7	.588
Iowa	4	–	7	.364	8	–	7	.533
Purdue	4	–	7	.364	6	–	8	.429
Wisconsin	3	–	9	.250	5	–	11	.313
Ohio State	2	–	6	.250	7	–	12	.368

The 1918–19 Indiana Hoosiers men's basketball team represented Indiana University. Their head coach was Dana Evans, who was in his second and final year. The team played its home games at the Men's Gymnasium in Bloomington, Indiana, and was a member of the Big Ten Conference.

The Hoosiers finished the regular season with an overall record of 10–7 and a conference record of 4–6, finishing 6th in the Big Ten Conference.

== Roster ==
Name	Position	Year	Hometown
Joy Buckner	G	So.	Bluffton, Indiana
Lawrence Busby	C	So.	Lapel, Indiana
Arlo Byrum	G	Jr.	Anderson, Indiana
Everett Dean	F/C	So.	Salem, Indiana
William Dobbins	G	So.	Bloomington, Indiana
William Easton	F	Jr.	Bloomington, Indiana
Urban Jeffries	F/C	Jr.	Rockville, Indiana
Joseph Lohrei	C	So.	Goshen, Indiana
Ardith Phillips	G	Jr.	Amo, Indiana
Byard Smith	G	Sr.	Decatur, Indiana
Markham Wakefield	F	Jr.	Washington, Indiana
William Zellar	G	Jr.	Brazil, Indiana

== Schedule/results ==
Date time, TV	Rank^{#}	Opponent^{#}	Result	Record	Site city, state
Regular season
1/2/1919*		at Vincennes YMCA	W 47–16	1–0	Vincennes, IN
1/11/1919		at Minnesota	L 13–35	1–1 (0–1)	UM Armory; Minneapolis, MN
1/13/1919		at Iowa	W 23–14	2–1 (1–1)	Iowa Armory; Iowa City, IA
1/20/1919		at Michigan	L 22–28	2–2 (1–2)	Waterman Gymnasium; Ann Arbor, MI
1/21/1919*		at Toledo	W 32–25	3–2 (1–2)	Toledo, OH
1/24/1919		Iowa	L 10–21	3–3 (1–3)	Men's Gymnasium; Bloomington, IN
1/27/1919*		DePauw	L 17–21	3–4 (1–3)	Men's Gymnasium; Bloomington, IN
1/31/1919*		Franklin College	W 35–19	4–4 (1–3)	Men's Gymnasium; Bloomington, IN
2/7/1919		Ohio State	L 21–22	4–5 (1–4)	Men's Gymnasium; Bloomington, IN
2/15/1919		at Ohio State	W 37–31	5–5 (2–4)	Columbus, OH
2/17/1919*		at Cincinnati	W 38–24	6–5 (2–4)	Schmidlapp Gymnasium; Cincinnati, OH
2/22/1919		Minnesota	L 14–20	6–6 (2–5)	Men's Gymnasium; Bloomington, IN
2/24/1919		Wisconsin	L 16–29	6–7 (2–6)	Men's Gymnasium; Bloomington, IN
3/3/1919*		Notre Dame	W 29–11	7–7 (2–6)	Men's Gymnasium; Bloomington, IN
3/6/1919*		at DePauw	W 17–16	8–7 (2–6)	Greencastle, IN
3/11/1919		Michigan	W 24–16	9–7 (3–6)	Men's Gymnasium; Bloomington, IN
3/15/1919		at Wisconsin	W 22–12	10–7 (4–6)	Red Gym; Madison, WI
*Non-conference game. ^{#}Rankings from AP Poll. (#) Tournament seedings in parentheses.
