= 1918–19 Minnesota Golden Gophers men's basketball team =

American college basketball season

1918–19 Minnesota Golden Gophers men's basketball

Big Ten Conference Champions Helms Foundation National Champions
- Conference: Big Ten Conference
- Record: 13–0 (10–0 Big Ten)
- Head coach: L. J. Cooke (22nd season)
- Home arena: UM Armory

1918–19 Big Ten Conference men's basketball standings
	Conf.				Overall
Team	W		L	PCT	W		L	PCT
Minnesota	10	–	0	1.000	13	–	0	1.000
Chicago	10	–	2	.833	21	–	6	.778
Northwestern	6	–	4	.600	6	–	6	.500
Michigan	5	–	5	.500	18	–	6	.750
Illinois	5	–	7	.417	6	–	8	.429
Indiana	4	–	6	.400	10	–	7	.588
Iowa	4	–	7	.364	8	–	7	.533
Purdue	4	–	7	.364	6	–	8	.429
Wisconsin	3	–	9	.250	5	–	11	.313
Ohio State	2	–	6	.250	7	–	12	.368

The 1918–19 Minnesota Golden Gophers men's basketball team represented the University of Minnesota in intercollegiate basketball during the 1918–19 season. The team finished the season with a 13–0 record and were named national champions by the Helms Athletic Foundation. Guard Erling Platou was named the national player of the year, becoming the University of Minnesota's first (and through the 2013–14 season, only) national player of the year award winner.

== Starters ==
- Arnold Oss – Forward
- Miles Lawler – Forward
- Norman Kingsley – Center
- Joel Hultkrans – Guard
- Erling Platou – Guard

== Schedule ==
Date time, TV	Rank^{#}	Opponent^{#}	Result	Record	Site city, state
Regular season
12/17/1918*		Overland Aviation	W 40–18	1–0	UM Armory; Minneapolis, MN
1/2/1919*		Aviation Cubs	W 50–7	2–0	UM Armory; Minneapolis, MN
1/4/1919*		Wisconsin–Stout	W 68–4	3–0	UM Armory; Minneapolis, MN
1/11/1919		Indiana	W 35–13	4–0 (1–0)	UM Armory; Minneapolis, MN
1/18/1919		Wisconsin	W 38–23	5–0 (2–0)	UM Armory; Minneapolis, MN
1/27/1919		Illinois	W 36–17	6–0 (3–0)	UM Armory; Minneapolis, MN
2/1/1919		at Iowa	W 28–18	7–0 (4–0)	
2/8/1919		Iowa	W 36–22	8–0 (5–0)	UM Armory; Minneapolis, MN
2/15/1919		Purdue	W 36–24	9–0 (6–0)	UM Armory; Minneapolis, MN
2/22/1919		at Indiana	W 20–14	10–0 (7–0)	Men's Gymnasium; Bloomington, IN
2/24/1919		at Purdue	W 26–21	11–0 (8–0)	Memorial Gymnasium; West Lafayette, IN
3/1/1919		at Wisconsin	W 23–12	12–0 (9–0)	Red Gym; Madison, WI
3/3/1919		at Illinois	W 26–9	13–0 (10–0)	Kenny Gym; Urbana, IL
*Non-conference game. ^{#}Rankings from AP Poll. (#) Tournament seedings in parentheses.
