= 1910–11 Missouri Tigers men's basketball team =

American college basketball season

1910–11 Missouri Tigers men's basketball
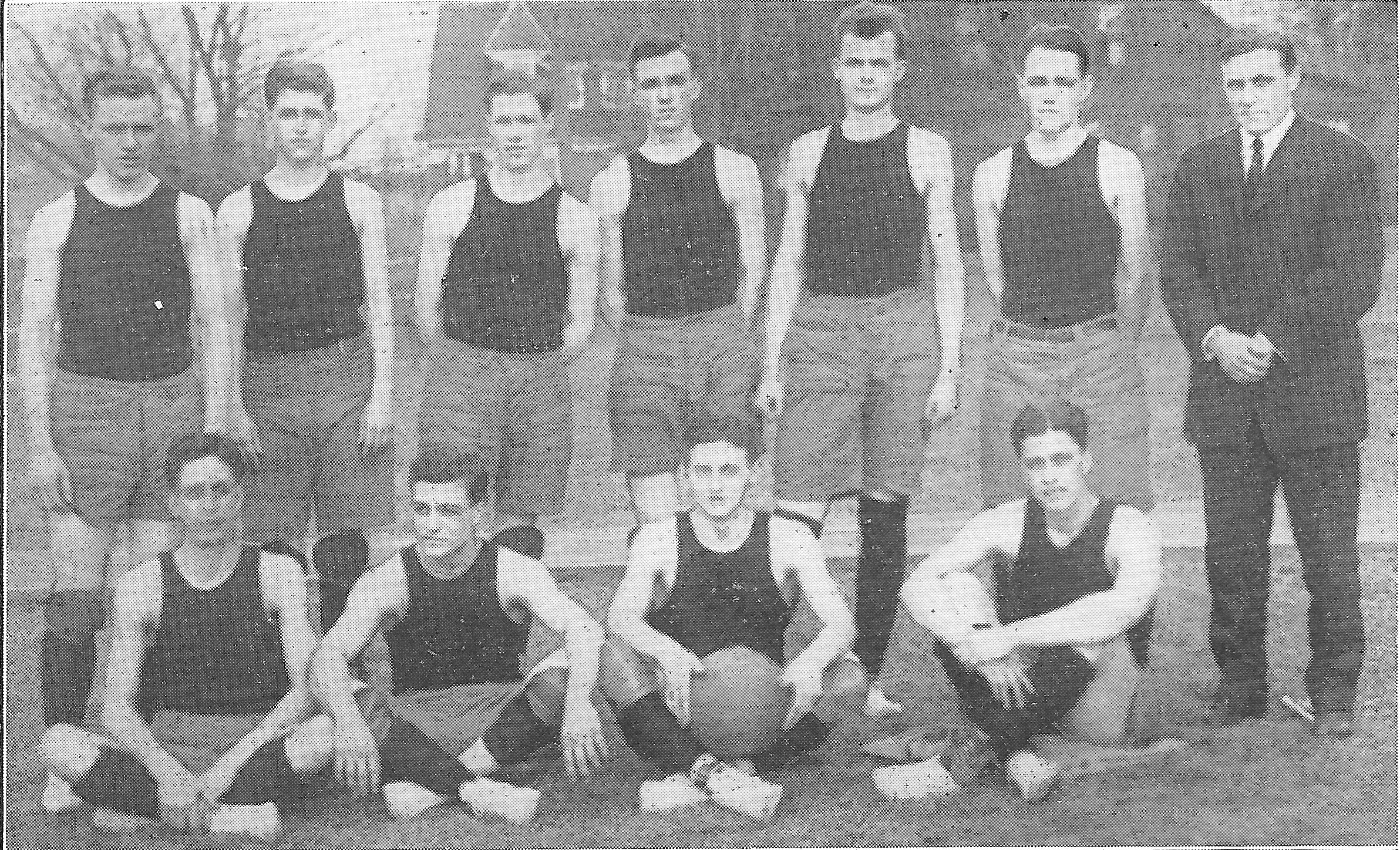
- Conference: Big Eight Conference
- Record: 5–7 (5–7 MVIAA)
- Head coach: Chester Brewer
- Home arena: Rothwell Gymnasium

1910–11 Missouri Valley Intercollegiate Athletic Association men's basketball standings
	Conf.				Overall
Team	W		L	PCT	W		L	PCT
Kansas	9	–	3	.750	12	–	6	.667
Nebraska	7	–	5	.583	11	–	7	.611
Iowa State	6	–	8	.429	6	–	11	.353
Missouri	4	–	8	.333	4	–	8	.333
Drake	0	–	2	.000	0	–	6	.000

The 1910–11 Missouri Tigers men's basketball team represented University of Missouri in the 1910–11 college basketball season. The team was led by first year head coach Chester Brewer. The captain of the team was Herman Cohen.

Missouri finished with a 5–7 record overall and a 5–7 record in the Missouri Valley Intercollegiate Athletic Association. This was good enough for a 4th-place finish in the regular season conference standings.

== Schedule and results ==
Date time, TV	Rank^{#}	Opponent^{#}	Result	Record	Site city, state
January 13		Iowa State	W 40–22	1–0 (1–0)	Columbia, Missouri
January 14		Iowa State	W 43–26	2–0 (2–0)	Columbia, Missouri
January 27		at Kansas	L 28–34	2–1 (2–1)	Lawrence, Kansas
January 28		at Kansas	L 15–27	2–2 (2–2)	Lawrence, Kansas
February 8		Nebraska	W 39–26	3–2 (3–2)	Columbia, Missouri
February 9		Nebraska	W 37–36 ^{OT}	4–2 (4–2)	Columbia, Missouri
February 17		Kansas	L 16–32	4–3 (4–3)	Columbia, Missouri
February 18		Kansas	L 25–36	4–4 (4–4)	Columbia, Missouri
February 24		at Iowa State	L 16–22	4–5 (4–5)	Ames, Iowa
February 25		at Iowa State	L 18–21	4–6 (4–6)	Ames, Iowa
February 26		at Nebraska	L 23–30	4–7 (4–7)	Lincoln, Nebraska
February 27		at Nebraska	W 23–20	5–7 (5–7)	Lincoln, Nebraska
*Non-conference game. ^{#}Rankings from Coaches' Poll. (#) Tournament seedings in parentheses. All times are in Central Standard Time.
