= 1918–19 Michigan Wolverines men's basketball team =

American college basketball season

1918–19 Michigan Wolverines men's basketball
- Conference: Big Ten Conference
- Record: 16–8 (5–5 Big Ten)
- Head coach: Elmer Mitchell
- Captain: John H. Emery
- Home arena: Waterman Gymnasium

1918–19 Big Ten Conference men's basketball standings
	Conf.				Overall
Team	W		L	PCT	W		L	PCT
Minnesota	10	–	0	1.000	13	–	0	1.000
Chicago	10	–	2	.833	21	–	6	.778
Northwestern	6	–	4	.600	6	–	6	.500
Michigan	5	–	5	.500	18	–	6	.750
Illinois	5	–	7	.417	6	–	8	.429
Indiana	4	–	6	.400	10	–	7	.588
Iowa	4	–	7	.364	8	–	7	.533
Purdue	4	–	7	.364	6	–	8	.429
Wisconsin	3	–	9	.250	5	–	11	.313
Ohio State	2	–	6	.250	7	–	12	.368

The 1918–19 Michigan Wolverines men's basketball team represented the University of Michigan in intercollegiate basketball during the 1918–19 season. The team compiled an overall record of 16–8 and finished in fourth place in the Big Ten Conference with a 5–5 record against conference opponents. Elmer Mitchell served as the coach, and John H. Emery was the team captain. Arthur Karpus was the team's leading scorer with 188 points (61 field goals and 66 free throws) in 23 games for an average of 8.2 points per game. Karpus's 188 points stood as Michigan's single season scoring record until the 1936–37 season when John Townsend scored 191 points.

== Schedule ==
Date	Opponent	Score	Result	Location
December 31, 1918	Pontiac Oaklands	21–3	Win	Pontiac, MI
January 1, 1919	Young Men's Order (Detroit)	29–10	Loss	YMCA, Detroit, MI
January 2, 1919	Detroit College of Law	23–15	Win	Moose Temple Court, Detroit, MI
January 4, 1919	Fort Wayne Nationals	17–11	Win	Fort Wayne, IN
January 5, 1919	Toledo University	24–19	Win	Toledo, OH
January 6, 1919	Detroit Rayls	24–13	Loss	Roller Palace, Detroit, MI
January 10, 1919	Camp Custer	25–12	Win	Waterman Gymnasium, Ann Arbor, MI
January 11, 1919	St. Mary's College	30–19	Win	Orchard Lake Village, MI
January 17, 1919	University of Detroit	39–18	Win	Waterman Gymnasium, Ann Arbor, MI
January 18, 1919	Kalamazoo Normal	49–19	Win	Kalamazoo, MI
January 20, 1919	Indiana	28–22	Win	Waterman Gymnasium, Ann Arbor, MI
January 24, 1919	Chicago	21–13	Loss	Bartlett Gymnasium, Chicago, IL
January 25, 1919	Northwestern	17–16	Loss	Patten Gymnasium, Evanston, IL
January 29, 1919	U.S. Gen. Hosp. Corp.	53–16	Win	Away game
February 1, 1919	Illinois	27–23	Loss	Waterman Gymnasium, Ann Arbor, MI
February 14, 1919	Detroit Naval Station	67–7	Win	Waterman Gymnasium, Ann Arbor, MI
February 15, 1919	Michigan Agricultural College	19–17	Win	Michigan State University Armory, East Lansing, MI
February 21, 1919	Ohio State	23–20	Win	Waterman Gymnasium, Ann Arbor, MI
February 22, 1919	Chicago	25–22	Loss	Waterman Gymnasium, Ann Arbor, MI
February 28, 1919	Michigan Agricultural College	33–24	Loss	Waterman Gymnasium, Ann Arbor, MI
March 2, 1919	Northwestern	24–22	Win	Waterman Gymnasium, Ann Arbor, MI
March 8, 1919	Ohio State	23–20	Win	Ohio Expo Center Coliseum, Columbus, OH
March 10, 1919	Illinois	22–18	Win	Kenney Gym, Urbana, IL
March 11, 1919	Indiana	24–16	Loss	Men's Gymnasium, Bloomington, IN

== Players ==
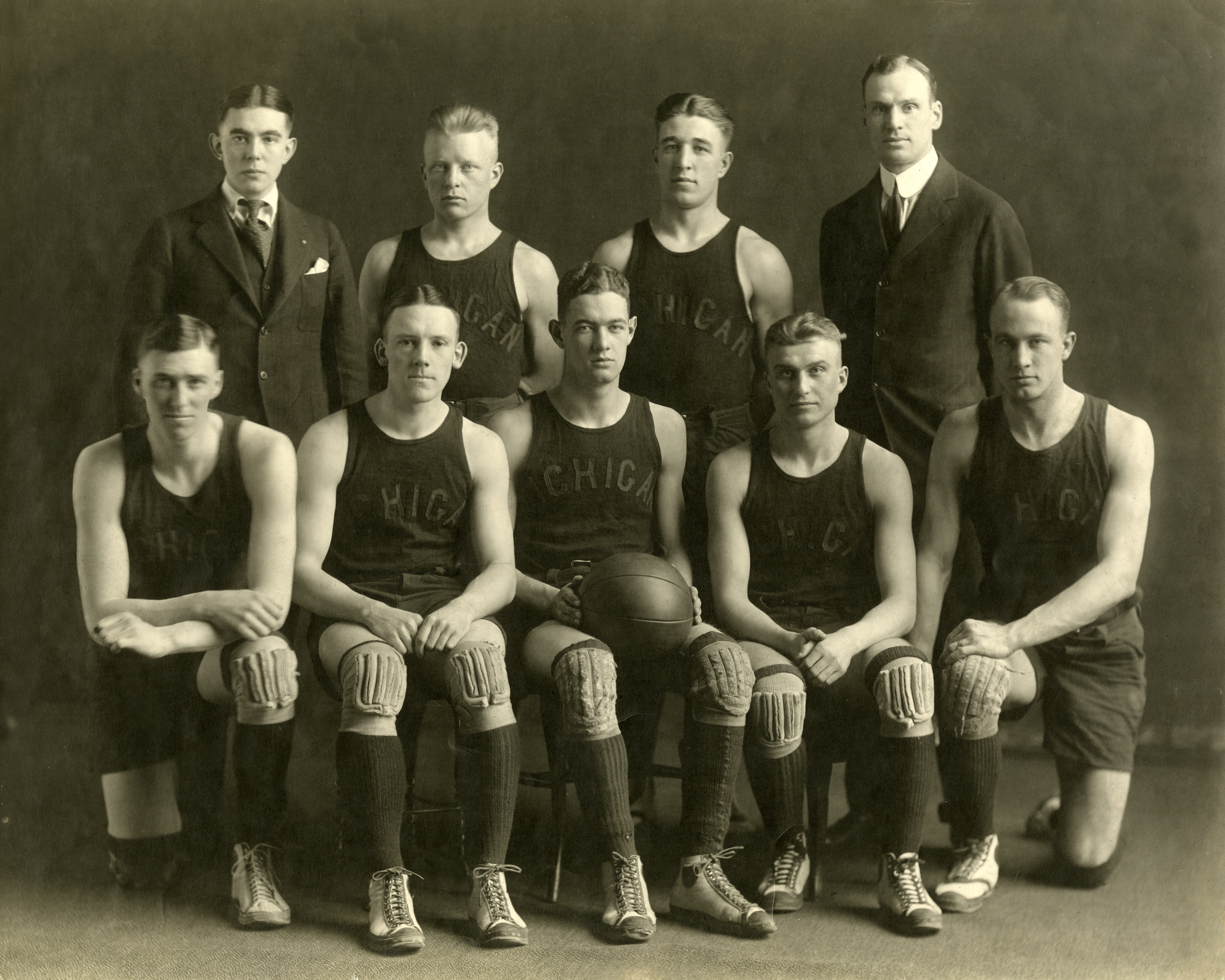
1918-1919 Michigan men's basketball team Back (from left): Harry Heffner, Wilford Wilson, Arthur Karpus, Elmer Mitchell Front (from left): Jack Williams, Timothy Hewlett, John Emery, Ralph Rychener, James McClintock

- Abe Cohn - aMa letter winner (varsity letter winner in football)
- Elmer Cress
- John H. Emery - forward and varsity letter winner
- Timothy Y. Hewlett - forward and varsity letter winner
- Arthur Karpus - forward and varsity letter winner
- Loring
- James I. McClintock - center and varsity letter winner
- Frank Novak - winner of an "R" letter as a reserve player
- Ralph O. Rychener - guard and varsity letter winner
- Benjamin Weiss - aMa letter winner
- F. Wickham
- Jack L. Williams - guard and varsity letter winner
- Wilford C. Wilson - guard and varsity letter winner

== Scoring statistics ==
Player	Games	Field goals	Free throws	Points	Points per game
Arthur Karpus	23	61	66	188	8.2
Timothy Y. Hewlett	23	28	41	97	4.2
Ralph O. Rychener	20	29	0	58	2.9
Jack Williams	22	27	0	54	2.5
Benjamin Weiss	15	21	12	54	3.6
James McClintock	9	21	0	42	4.7
Abe Cohn	10	21	12	42	4.2
Loring	9	20	0	40	4.4
Samuel Bornstein	10	13	3	29	2.9
Wilford Wilson	18	4	0	8	0.4
Elmer Cress	6	2	0	4	0.7
John Emery	4	1	0	2	0.5
Total	23	248	122	618	26.9

== Coaching staff ==
- Elmer Mitchell - coach
- Harry W. Heffner - manager
- Philip Bartelme - graduate director
