= 1918–19 Wisconsin Badgers men's basketball team =

American college basketball season

1918–19 Wisconsin Badgers men's basketball
- Conference: Big Ten Conference
- Record: 5–11 (3–9 Big Ten)
- Head coach: Guy Lowman
- Home arena: Red Gym

1918–19 Big Ten Conference men's basketball standings
	Conf.				Overall
Team	W		L	PCT	W		L	PCT
Minnesota	10	–	0	1.000	13	–	0	1.000
Chicago	10	–	2	.833	21	–	6	.778
Northwestern	6	–	4	.600	6	–	6	.500
Michigan	5	–	5	.500	18	–	6	.750
Illinois	5	–	7	.417	6	–	8	.429
Indiana	4	–	6	.400	10	–	7	.588
Iowa	4	–	7	.364	8	–	7	.533
Purdue	4	–	7	.364	6	–	8	.429
Wisconsin	3	–	9	.250	5	–	11	.313
Ohio State	2	–	6	.250	7	–	12	.368

The 1918–19 Wisconsin Badgers men's basketball team represented University of Wisconsin–Madison. The head coach was Guy Lowman, coaching his second season with the Badgers. The team played their home games at the Red Gym in Madison, Wisconsin and was a member of the Big Ten Conference.

== Schedule ==
Date time, TV	Rank^{#}	Opponent^{#}	Result	Record	Site city, state
Regular Season
12/27/1918*		at Camp Grant (IL)	W 16–15 ^{OT}	1–0	Knights of Columbus Building; Rockford, IL
12/28/1918*		at Great Lakes (IL)	L 14–43	1–1	Drill Hall; Waukegan, IL
12/30/1918*		at Milwaukee	W 39–18	2–1	Milwaukee, WI
1/04/1919*		Great Lakes (IL)	L 12–14	2–2	Red Gym; Madison, WI
1/11/1919		Northwestern	L 15–20	2–3 (0–1)	Red Gym; Madison, WI
1/18/1919		at Minnesota	L 11–38	2–4 (0–2)	Minnesota Armory; Minneapolis, MN
1/25/1919		Illinois	L 15–25	2–5 (0–3)	Red Gym; Madison, WI
2/01/1919		Chicago	L 19–24	2–6 (0–4)	Red Gym; Madison, WI
2/10/1919		Iowa	W 29–18	3–6 (1–4)	Red Gym; Madison, WI
2/15/1919		at Illinois	L 14–16	3–7 (1–5)	Kenney Gym; Urbana, IL
2/22/1919		at Northwestern	L 23–32	3–8 (1–6)	Patten Gymnasium; Evanston, IL
2/24/1919		at Indiana	W 29–16	4–8 (2–6)	Men's Gymnasium; Bloomington, IN
3/01/1919		Minnesota	L 12–23	4–9 (2–7)	Red Gym; Madison, WI
3/08/1919		at Chicago	W 25–15	5–9 (3–7)	Bartlett Gymnasium; Chicago, IL
3/10/1919		at Iowa	L 27–29	5–10 (3–8)	Iowa Armory; Iowa City, IA
3/15/1919		Indiana	L 12–22	5–11 (3–9)	Red Gym; Madison, WI
*Non-conference game. ^{#}Rankings from AP Poll. (#) Tournament seedings in parentheses.
