= 1916–17 Missouri Tigers men's basketball team =

American college basketball season

1916–17 Missouri Tigers men's basketball
- Conference: Missouri Valley Intercollegiate Athletic Association
- Record: 12–4 (10–4 MVIAA)
- Head coach: John F. Miller
- Home arena: Rothwell Gymnasium

The 1916–17 Missouri Tigers men's basketball team represented the University of Missouri during the 1916–17 college basketball season. The team was led by first year head coach John Miller. The captain of the team was Fred Williams.

Missouri finished with a 12–4 record overall and a 10–4 record in the Missouri Valley Intercollegiate Athletic Association. This was good enough for a 2nd-place finish in the regular season conference standings.

== Schedule and results ==
Date time, TV	Rank^{#}	Opponent^{#}	Result	Record	Site city, state
January 6*		Central Methodist	W 47–21	1–0	Columbia, Missouri
January 12		Iowa State	W 28–25	2–0 (1–0)	Columbia, Missouri
January 13		Iowa State	L 21–24	2–1 (1–1)	Columbia, Missouri
January 19		Washington University	W 36–22	3–1 (2–1)	Columbia, Missouri
January 20		Washington University	W 30–20	4–1 (3–1)	Columbia, Missouri
February 2*		Kansas City Poly	W 52–20	5–1 (3–1)	Columbia, Missouri
February 6		at Kansas	L 23–24	5–2 (3–2)	Lawrence, Kansas
February 7		at Kansas	W 26–17	6–2 (4–2)	Lawrence, Kansas
February 9		at Nebraska	W 18–16	7–2 (5–2)	Lincoln, Nebraska
February 10		at Nebraska	W 18–7	8–2 (6–2)	Lincoln, Nebraska
February 21		Kansas	W 24–20	9–2 (7–2)	Columbia, Missouri
February 22		Kansas	W 38–15	10–2 (8–2)	Columbia, Missouri
March 5		Kansas State	L 22–26	10–3 (8–3)	Columbia, Missouri
March 6		Kansas State	L 27–32	10–4 (8–4)	Columbia, Missouri
March 8		at Washington University	W 23–19	11–4 (9–4)	St. Louis, Missouri
March 9		at Washington University	W 31–22	12–4 (10–4)	St. Louis, Missouri
*Non-conference game. ^{#}Rankings from Coaches' Poll. (#) Tournament seedings in parentheses. All times are in Central Standard Time.
