= 1918–19 Illinois Fighting Illini men's basketball team =

American college basketball season

1918–19 Illinois Fighting Illini men's basketball
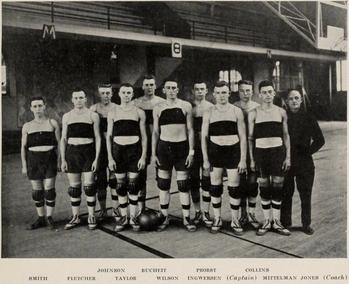
- Conference: Big Ten Conference
- Record: 6–8 (5–7 Big Ten)
- Head coach: Ralph Jones (7th season)
- Captain: Burt Ingwersen
- Home arena: Kenney Gym

1918–19 Big Ten Conference men's basketball standings
	Conf.				Overall
Team	W		L	PCT	W		L	PCT
Minnesota	10	–	0	1.000	13	–	0	1.000
Chicago	10	–	2	.833	21	–	6	.778
Northwestern	6	–	4	.600	6	–	6	.500
Michigan	5	–	5	.500	18	–	6	.750
Illinois	5	–	7	.417	6	–	8	.429
Indiana	4	–	6	.400	10	–	7	.588
Iowa	4	–	7	.364	8	–	7	.533
Purdue	4	–	7	.364	6	–	8	.429
Wisconsin	3	–	9	.250	5	–	11	.313
Ohio State	2	–	6	.250	7	–	12	.368

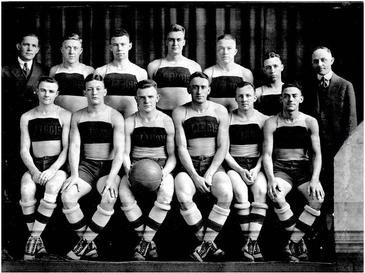
"1918-19 Fighting Illini men's basketball team"

The 1918–19 Illinois Fighting Illini men's basketball team represented the University of Illinois.

== Regular season ==
The 1918–19 season for the Illinois Fighting Illini men's basketball team, was the lowest point of Ralph Jones' tenure at the school. Jones had never lost more than six conference games in any campaign. This would be Jones' only losing season in his college basketball coaching career. The Illini finished the season with 6 wins and 8 losses, with 6 wins and 6 losses in conference play. The starting lineup included captain Burt Ingwersen, Benjamin Mittleman and Ralph Fletcher at the forward positions, K.L. Wilson at center, and W.K. Kopp and P.C. Taylor as guards.

=== Roster ===
1918–19 Illinois Fighting Illini men's basketball team
Players
Coaches

Pos.	#	Name	Height	Weight	Year	Hometown
F		Ralph Fletcher	—	—	So	Champaign, Illinois
F		Burt Ingwersen (C)	—	—	Jr	Urbana, Illinois
C		John S. Probst	—	—	Jr	East Aurora, Illinois
C		Paul C. Taylor	—	—	Jr	New Orleans, Louisiana
C		Kenneth L. Wilson	—	—	Jr	Wilmette, Illinois
G		William K. Kopp	—	—	So	Beverly Farms, Massachusetts
F		Benjamin F. Mittleman	—	—	Sr	East Farmingdale, New York
G		George Buchheit	—	—	So	Beardstown, Illinois
F		Daniel Willard Smith	—	—	Fr	Bellflower, Illinois
F		Thomas Johnson	—	—	So	Homer, Illinois

Head coach

- Ralph Jones (Indianapolis YMCA Training School) (7th year)

Assistant coach(es)

Legend

- (C) Team captain
- (S) Suspended
- (I) Ineligible
- (W) Walk-on
- Injured
- Current redshirt

Roster

== Schedule ==
Date time, TV	Rank^{#}	Opponent^{#}	Result	Record	Site (attendance) city, state
Non-Conference regular season
1/3/1919*		Great Lakes	L 26–28	0-1	Kenney Gym (467); Urbana, IL
1/10/1919*		Millikin University	W 37–17	1-1	Kenney Gym (577); Urbana, IL
Big Ten regular season
1/18/1919		Purdue	L 13–16	1-2 (0-1)	Kenney Gym (1,519); Urbana, IL
1/20/1919		Ohio State	W 25–20	2-2 (1-1)	Kenney Gym (1,462); Urbana, IL
1/25/1919		at Wisconsin	W 25–15	3-2 (2-1)	University of Wisconsin Armory and Gymnasium (-); Madison, WI
1/27/1919		at Minnesota	L 17–36	3-3 (2-2)	University of Minnesota Armory (-); Minneapolis, MN
2/1/1919		at Michigan	W 27–23	4-3 (3-2)	Waterman Gymnasium (-); Ann Arbor, MI
2/8/1919		at University of Chicago	L 12–17	4-4 (3-3)	Bartlett Gymnasium (-); Chicago, IL
2/15/1919		Wisconsin	W 16–14	5-4 (4-3)	Kenney Gym (1,774); Urbana, IL
2/21/1919		at Purdue	W 25–18	6-4 (5-3)	Memorial Gymnasium (-); West Lafayette, IN
2/24/1919		at Ohio State	L 15–32	6-5 (5-4)	Ohio Expo Center Coliseum (-); Columbus, OH
3/1/1919		University of Chicago	L 15–17	6-6 (5-5)	Kenney Gym (2,126); Urbana, IL
3/3/1919		Minnesota	L 9–26	6-7 (5-6)	Kenney Gym (1,485); Urbana, IL
3/10/1919		Michigan	L 18–22	6-8 (5-7)	Kenney Gym (1,329); Urbana, IL
*Non-conference game. ^{#}Rankings from AP Poll. (#) Tournament seedings in parentheses. All times are in Central Time.

== Player stats ==
Player	Games played	Field goals	Free throws	Points
Kenneth Wilson	14	28	53	109
Paul Taylor	12	24	6	54
Ralph Fletcher	12	23	2	48
Bert Ingwersen	13	10	0	20
Benjamin Mittleman	13	8	1	17
D.W. Smith	7	6	1	13
