= 1918–19 Washington State men's basketball team =

American college basketball season

1918–19 Washington State Cougars men's basketball
- Conference: Pacific Coast Conference
- Record: 10–11 (7–5 PCC)
- Head coach: Fred Bohler (11th season)

1918–19 Pacific Coast Conference men's basketball standings
	Conf.				Overall
Team	W		L	PCT	W		L	PCT
Oregon	11	–	3	.786	13	–	4	.765
Washington State	7	–	5	.583	10	–	11	.476
California	2	–	2	.500	6	–	3	.667
Washington	5	–	7	.417	6	–	10	.375
Oregon Agricultural	3	–	9	.250	3	–	13	.188
Stanford	0	–	2	.000	9	–	3	.750
As of 1919

The 1918–19 Washington State Cougars men's basketball team represented Washington State College for the 1918–19 college basketball season. Led by eleventh-year head coach Fred Bohler, the Cougars were members of the Pacific Coast Conference and played their home games on campus in Pullman, Washington.

The Cougars were 10–11 overall in the regular season and 7–5 in conference play, second in the standings.
