= Erling Platou =

American basketball player and pediatrician (1896–1958)

Personal information
- Born: August 30, 1896 Cooperstown, North Dakota, U.S.
- Died: June 17, 1958 (aged 61) Cook County, Minnesota, U.S.
- Listed height: 5 ft 11 in (1.80 m)
- Listed weight: 155 lb (70 kg)

Career information
- High school: Valley City (Valley City, North Dakota)
- College: Minnesota (1914–1916, 1918–1920)
- Position: Guard

Career highlights
- Helms Player of the Year (1919); Helms All-American (1919)

Erling Stoud Platou (August 30, 1896 – June 17, 1958) was an American standout college basketball player at the University of Minnesota and, later, a pediatrician at the University of Minnesota Medical Center.

As a guard on the basketball team, Platou led the 1918–19 Golden Gophers to an undefeated season (13–0 overall, 10–0 conference) by averaging a then-remarkable 11.6 points per game. In the early days of basketball, such a scoring average was unheard of, and it was his prowess that earned him the Helms Foundation National Player of the Year honor that season as a junior. The Helms Foundation also awarded Minnesota a retroactive national championship years later for the 1918–19 season.

Platou's basketball career was disrupted due to World War I. He played on the team in 1914–15 and 1915–16, but then the war temporarily ceased all intercollegiate sports at Minnesota. They resumed play in 1918–19, and Platou finished his career in 1919–20 before graduating that spring.
