= George F. Parrish =

American athlete (1897–1971)

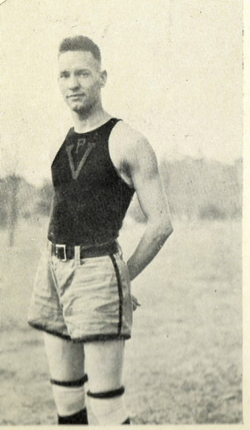
George Parrish was a unanimous selection as first team all-South Atlantic conference center in 1919, 1920 and 1921..

George Frizzell Parrish (March 23, 1897 – September 22, 1971) was an American athlete, coach, and politician.

He was born in Bristol, Virginia, and attended Virginia Tech, where he was unanimously named the first team all-South Atlantic Intercollegiate Athletic Association center three times in the seasons ending in 1919, 1920 and 1921. He scored 320 points in the 1919 season. In 1921, he scored 348 points on 116 field goals and 116 free throws. This represented almost half of the team's 723 total points. He was also an all-South Atlantic Conference end for the football team, and competed in the discus and javelin events for the track and field team. At the end of 1919, he held the Tech javelin record throw of 146.5 feet.

After college, he served as athletic director and coach for Potomac State College from 1922 to 1933, and entered the insurance business. He was elected to the West Virginia House of Delegates in 1934, and was later executive secretary of the West Virginia Railroad Association.

He died on September 22, 1971, in Charleston, West Virginia, and in 1986 was inducted into the Virginia Tech Sports Hall of Fame, the fifth class of Hall of Fame inductees.
