= Men's Gymnasium (Indiana University) =

Athletic facility in Bloomington, Indiana

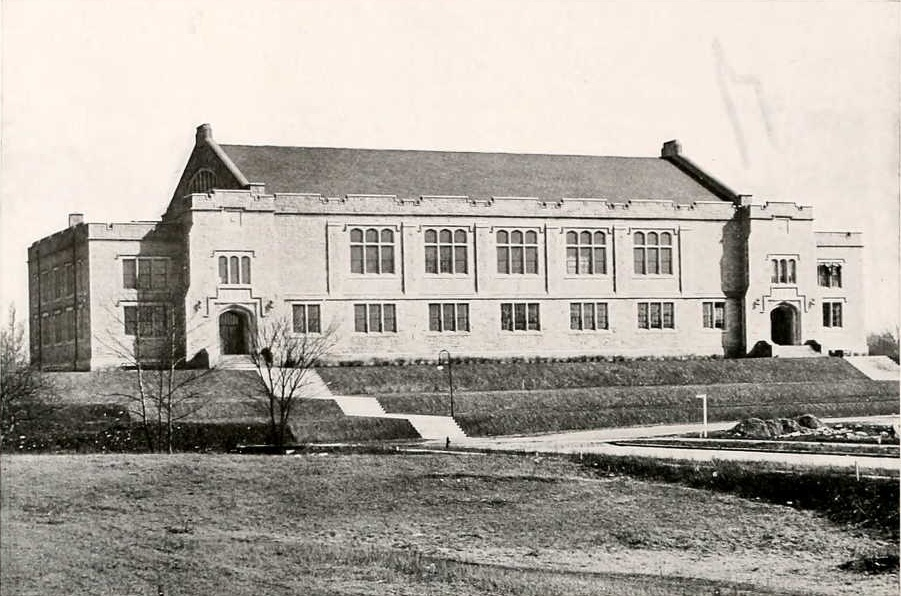
- Interactive map of Men's Gymnasium
- Location: 1025 E. 7th Street; Bloomington, IN 47405
- Coordinates: 39.169181°N 86.521235°W
- Owner: Indiana University
- Operator: Indiana University
- Capacity: 2,400 (approx., former)

Construction
- Groundbreaking: 1916
- Opened: 1917
- Cost: $250,000

Tenant
- Indiana University

The Men's Gymnasium (now part of the Indiana University School of Public Health-Bloomington building) is an on-campus indoor athletic facility on the campus of Indiana University in Bloomington, Indiana. From 1917 to 1928, it also served as the home of the Indiana Hoosiers men's basketball team.

== Current use ==
The Men's Gymnasium, more commonly referred to now as part of the School of Public Health-Bloomington building, is part of a complex for the Indiana University School of Public Health-Bloomington, as well as the recreational programs offered by the school's Division of Recreational Sports. The Men's Gymnasium, together with the Bill Garrett Fieldhouse, make up the SPHB complex.

== History ==
The Indiana Hoosiers began playing in the Men's Gymnasium in 1917. In addition to its 2400-seat basketball court, the new facility included a pool and track. The building was constructed in a Gothic style using local limestone at a cost of $250,000. Indiana won their first game in the new facility on 19 January against Iowa 12–7.

Due to complaints from spectators seated behind the backboards about poor visibility, the arena installed glass backboards a few years later. These glass backboards, which were manufactured by the Nurre Mirror Plate Company, may have been the first to be used in the United States.

The basketball team's last season in the facility was in 1927–28, when the team won the conference championship. Because of the growing popularity of basketball at the school and the growing size of the student body, the team moved to a larger arena.

== Swastika tiles ==
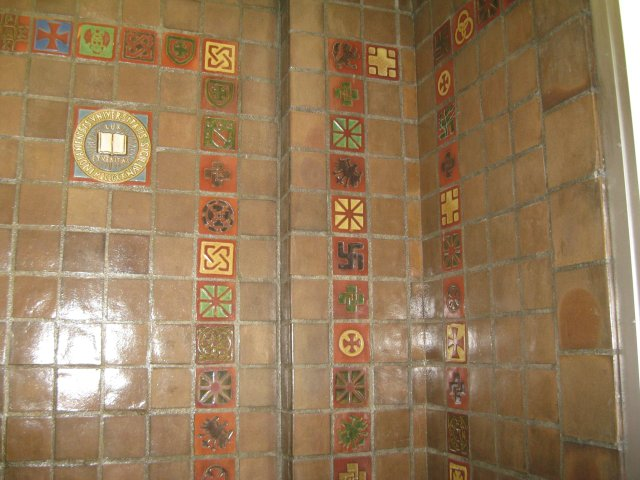
Tiles in the building, including one depicting a black swastika

Tiles in the building depict symbols representing health and well-being in various cultures, including swastikas, a symbol which later became negatively associated with and pre-dated Germany's Third Reich. A plaque in the lobby addresses this and reads:

Installed in 1917 with the construction of the original IU Men’s Gymnasium building, the elaborate ceramic tiles in the foyer of each wing contain symbols from cultures around the world. These beautiful and historic tiles represent themes of energy, movement, good fortune, prosperity, growth, health, and harmony. Collectively they represent aspirations for a healthy life through fitness and wellbeing.

Among the tiles you may see are equilateral crosses with four arms bent at 90°, known historically as swastikas. The word swastika comes from the Sanskrit svastika - "su" meaning "good," "asti" meaning "to be," and "ka" as a suffix. Thus, swastika, literally means "to be good."

The origins of this symbol are quite ancient. The earliest archaeological evidence of these ornaments dates back to the Indus Valley Civilization, Ancient India, as well as Classical Antiquity. The spiritual design has been used by Greeks, Romans, Celts, Buddhists, Jainists, Hindus, and Native Americans. Up until its adoption, in a modified form, by the National Socialist German Workers' (Nazi) Party, it was very commonly used as a symbol of good fortune for thousands of years worldwide.

The display of the ancient symbol on these walls should in no way be interpreted as an endorsement of the political and social ideologies of the Nazi party and the atrocities the regime committed. Its inclusion here in its historical form predates the rise to power and horrific abuses of the Nazis.

The inclusion of this motif should be interpreted in its most pure and benign form, as a token of wellbeing, as it was intended when the building was constructed.
