= Dutch Lonborg =

American athlete, coach, and administrator (1898–1985)

Biographical details
- Born: March 16, 1898; Gardner, Illinois, U.S.
- Died: January 31, 1985 (aged 86); Horton, Kansas, U.S.

Playing career

Basketball
- 1917–1920: Kansas

Football
- 1917–1920: Kansas

Baseball
- 1918–1920: Kansas
- Positions: Guard (basketball); End, quarterback (football)

Coaching career (HC unless noted)

Basketball
- 1921–1923: McPherson
- 1924–1927: Washburn
- 1927–1950: Northwestern

Football
- 1921–1922: McPherson
- 1923: Washburn (assistant)

Administrative career (AD unless noted)
- 1950–1963: Kansas

Head coaching record
- Overall: 10–10 (football); 321–224–2 (basketball)

Accomplishments and honors

Championships
- Basketball; 2 Big Ten (1931, 1933); Helms Athletic Foundation national (1931)

Awards
- 2× All-MVC (1919, 1920); No. 7 retired by Kansas Jayhawks
- Basketball Hall of Fame; Inducted in 1973 (profile)
- College Basketball Hall of Fame; Inducted in 2006

Arthur C. "Dutch" Lonborg (March 16, 1898 – January 31, 1985) was an American college football, college basketball, and college baseball player, coach, and athletics administrator.

== Basketball ==
The Gardner, Illinois native coached for 23 years at McPherson College, Washburn College, and Northwestern University. Lonborg graduated in 1921 from University of Kansas, having played two years under coach Phog Allen.

In 1921 Dutch won an Amateur Athletic Union (AAU) title as a player with the Kansas City Athletic Club Blue Diamonds. In 1925 he coached Washburn College to an AAU title, the last time a college team won that championship. Later he coached at Northwestern, getting 237 wins during his time there, and leading them to Big Ten Conference championships in 1931 and 1933. His 1930–31 team finished the season with a 16–1 record, was retroactively named the national champion by the Helms Athletic Foundation, and was retroactively listed as the top team of the season by the Premo-Porretta Power Poll. He had an overall 323–217 college coaching record at all three schools.

After he retired from coaching, he became chairman of the NCAA Tournament Committee from 1947 to 1960, succeeding Harold Olsen. He was the U.S. Olympic team manager for the 1960 Olympics. He also served as the Kansas Jayhawks athletic director from 1950 to 1963.

Lonborgwas inducted into the Naismith Memorial Basketball Hall of Fame in 1973 as a coach.

== Head coaching record ==
=== Basketball ===
Record table
| Season | Team | Overall | Conference | Standing | Postseason |
|---|---|---|---|---|---|
Washburn (Kansas Conference) (1923–1927)
| 1923–24 | Washburn | 13–4 | | | |
| 1924–25 | Washburn | 15–0 | | | AAU Champions |
| 1925–26 | Washburn | 12–1–1 | | | |
| 1926–27 | Washburn | 12–8 | | | |
| Washburn: | | 52–13–1 (0.800) | | | |
Northwestern (Western Conference) (1927–1950)
| 1927-28 | Northwestern | 12–5 | 9–3 | T–3rd | |
| 1928–29 | Northwestern | 12–5 | 7–5 | 4th | |
| 1929–30 | Northwestern | 8–8 | 6–6 | 6th | |
| 1930–31 | Northwestern | 16–1 | 11–1 | 1st | Helms National Champion |
| 1931–32 | Northwestern | 13–5 | 9–3 | T–2nd | |
| 1932–33 | Northwestern | 15–4 | 10–2 | T–1st | |
| 1933–34 | Northwestern | 11–8 | 8–4 | T–2nd | |
| 1934–35 | Northwestern | 10–10 | 3–9 | 8th | |
| 1935–36 | Northwestern | 13–6 | 7–5 | T–3rd | |
| 1936–37 | Northwestern | 11–9–1^{[Note A]} | 4–8 | 7th | |
| 1937–38 | Northwestern | 10–10 | 7–5 | T–3rd | |
| 1938–39 | Northwestern | 7–13 | 5–7 | 6th | |
| 1939–40 | Northwestern | 13–7 | 7–5 | T–4th | |
| 1940–41 | Northwestern | 7–11 | 3–9 | 9th | |
| 1941–42 | Northwestern | 8–13 | 5–10 | T–7th | |
| 1942–43 | Northwestern | 8–9 | 7–5 | 3rd | |
| 1943–44 | Northwestern | 12–7 | 8–4 | T–4th | |
| 1944–45 | Northwestern | 7–12 | 4–8 | T–6th | |
| 1945–46 | Northwestern | 15–5 | 8–4 | T–3rd | |
| 1946–47 | Northwestern | 7–13 | 2–10 | 9th | |
| 1947–48 | Northwestern | 6–14 | 3–9 | T–8th | |
| 1948–49 | Northwestern | 5–16 | 2–10 | 9th | |
| 1949–50 | Northwestern | 10–12 | 3–9 | T–8th | |
| Northwestern: | | 236–203–1 (.538) | 138–141 (.495) | | |
| Total: | | 288–216-2 (0.571) | | | |
National champion Postseason invitational champion Conference regular season champion Conference regular season and conference tournament champion Division regular season champion Division regular season and conference tournament champion Conference tournament champion

^A.Due to a scoring error during the Notre Dame game in 1936, a game which was originally ruled a 21–20 win for Notre Dame was determined to be a tie when it was discovered Notre Dame had received one more point than they had actually scored. Notre Dame returned to the court to finish the game, but Northwestern refused to return to the court. The Wildcats left the building and the game was deemed a tie.

=== Football ===
| Year | Team | Overall | Conference | Standing | Bowl/playoffs |
|---|---|---|---|---|---|
McPherson Bulldogs (Kansas Collegiate Athletic Conference) (1921–1922)
| 1921 | McPherson | 5–6 | 2–6 | 13th | |
| 1922 | McPherson | 5–4 | 5–4 | 7th | |
| McPherson: | | 10–10 | 7–10 | | |
| Total: | | 10–10 | | | |
