= State Gymnasium =

Athletic facility at Iowa State University

Coordinates: 42.025123°N 93.652869°W

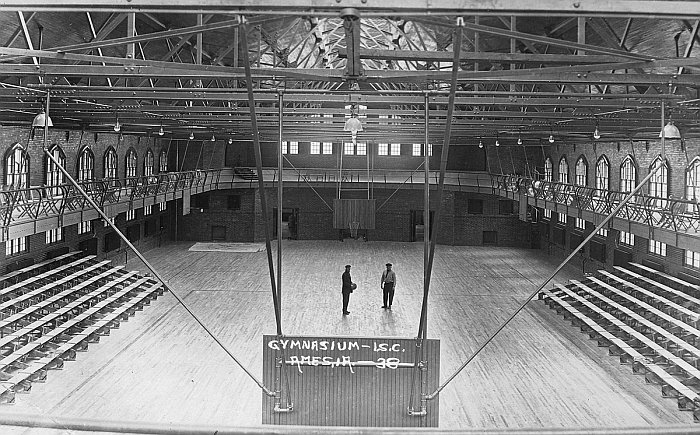
- Interactive map of State Gymnasium
- Location: Union Drive; Ames, IA 50011
- Owner: Iowa State University
- Operator: Iowa State University
- Capacity: N/A

Construction
- Groundbreaking: May 22, 1911
- Opened: Spring, 1913
- Cost: $150,000
- Architect: Proudfoot, Bird & Rawson

Tenants
- Iowa State University recreational sports Iowa State Cyclones men's basketball (1913-1946)

State Gymnasium is an arena on the campus of Iowa State University in Ames, Iowa. It was opened in 1913, and once was the school's primary indoor athletic facility, before the opening of Hilton Coliseum. It is located at the corner of Union Drive, just north of the site of the former Clyde Williams Stadium.

The brick building was built in two years at a cost of $150,000. It was intended for use as an armory and fieldhouse, something for which the school had been attempting to get funding since the early 1890s. The Iowa State basketball team played in the arena from 1913 until 1946. Beginning in 1946, home games were held in the Iowa State Armory, which continued until the construction of Hilton Coliseum in 1971. State Gym has since been renovated into recreational facilities, including four basketball courts, a swimming pool (the original home of the swimming team), tennis courts, a 1/12 mile indoor track, and other facilities for recreational sports.
