= Robinson Gymnasium =

Gymnasium at the University of Kansas in Lawrence, Kansas

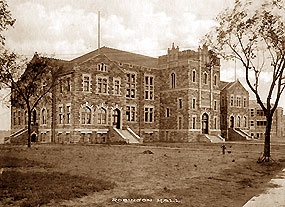
- Interactive map of Robinson Gymnasium
- Coordinates: 38°57′26″N 95°14′51″W
- Owner: University of Kansas
- Operator: University of Kansas
- Capacity: 2,500

Construction
- Groundbreaking: 1905
- Opened: May 1907
- Cost: $100,000 (original) ($3.46 million in 2025 dollars)

Tenant
- Kansas Jayhawks (NCAA DI) (1907–1927)

Robinson Gymnasium was the first true gymnasium for the University of Kansas (KU) in Lawrence, Kansas and home to the Kansas Jayhawks men's basketball program from 1907 to 1927. It was designed by James Naismith at a cost of $100,000. The creation of the modern facilities were led by Naismith and Chancellor Frank Strong. Naismith wanted the gymnasium not just for basketball but also for his other physical education classes and sports activities. The gymnasium was named after Charles L. Robinson, who was the first governor of Kansas, and his wife Sara Tappan Doolittle Robinson, both as thanks for their service and to make amends for what Sara perceived to be excessive pressure on her nephew to sell 51 acres (21 ha) of land to KU at a below-market price. Construction began in 1905 and was completed in May 1907.

The building was a significant improvement over Snow Hall, which had 11-foot ceilings and support beams in the middle of the floor. Robinson Gymnasium featured a swimming pool, men's and women's locker rooms, a main-floor gymnasium, 1/16-mile running track, a batting cage, a full range of gymnastics equipment and a 2,500-seat auditorium. The gymnasium served many purposes including dances, enrollments, commencements, concerts, lectures, and even as emergency housing immediately after World War II.

The men's basketball team amassed a 148–28 record at Robinson before the team moved to the larger Hoch Auditorium in 1927. The gymnasium was demolished in November 1967 and was replaced with Wescoe Hall.
