= Missouri Valley Intercollegiate Athletic Association =

- Founded: 1907
- Region: Midwestern United States

The Missouri Valley Intercollegiate Athletic Association (MVIAA) was a college athletic conference and the second college conference formed upon its foundation on January 12, 1907. The conference was initially formed by an agreement among representatives of five schools, the University of Kansas, University of Missouri, University of Nebraska, University of Iowa, and Washington University in St. Louis. Iowa State College and Drake University, both joined the conference together in March 1907. The University of Iowa, which had only taken part in football, left after the 1908 season and remained a member of the Big Ten Conference, but other schools joined the MVIAA, including Kansas State University, Grinnell College, the University of Oklahoma, and Oklahoma A&M.

In 1928, the conference split apart into two conferences, both of which claimed to be the legitimate heir to the MVIAA's history. Six schools — Iowa State, Kansas, Kansas State, Missouri, Nebraska, and Oklahoma — reorganized under the MVIAA name. This conference, popularly known as the "Big Six Conference" at the time and later as the Big Seven Conference, would eventually evolve into the Big Eight Conference. Drake, Grinnell, Washington, and Oklahoma A&M formed the Missouri Valley Conference, which retained the same administrative staff as the MVIAA. Until the Big Eight disbanded in 1996, both conferences claimed 1907 as their founding date and the same history through May 1928. To this day, it has never been definitively established which conference was the original.

== Members ==
=== Final pre-split members ===
Institution	Location	Founded	Joined	Left	Type	Nickname	Split to	Current conference
Drake University	Des Moines, Iowa	1881	1907	1928	Private	Bulldogs	Missouri Valley	Missouri Valley
Grinnell College	Grinnell, Iowa	1846	1918	1928	Private	Pioneers	Missouri Valley	Midwest (NCAA Division III)
Iowa State College (Note: Currently known as Iowa State University.)	Ames, Iowa	1858	1907	1928	Public	Cyclones	Big Six	Big 12
University of Kansas	Lawrence, Kansas	1865	1907	1928	Public	Jayhawks	Big Six	Big 12
Kansas State College (Note: Currently known as Kansas State University.)	Manhattan, Kansas	1863	1913	1928	Public	Wildcats	Big Six	Big 12
University of Missouri	Columbia, Missouri	1839	1907	1928	Public	Tigers	Big Six	SEC
University of Nebraska	Lincoln, Nebraska	1869	1907; 1921	1919; 1928	Public	Cornhuskers	Big Six	Big Ten
University of Oklahoma	Norman, Oklahoma	1890	1920	1928	Public	Sooners	Big Six	SEC
Oklahoma A&M College (Note: Currently known as Oklahoma State University–Stillwater.)	Stillwater, Oklahoma	1890	1925	1928	Public	Aggies/Cowboys (Note: During Oklahoma A&M's tenure in the MVIAA, the nicknames "Aggies" and "Cowboys" were used interchangeably. When the school adopted its current name in 1957, the "Cowboys" nickname was exclusively adopted.)	Missouri Valley	Big 12
Washington University in St. Louis	St. Louis, Missouri	1853	1907	1928	Private	Bears	Missouri Valley	UAA (NCAA Division III)

=== Previous member ===
Institution	Location	Founded	Joined	Left	Type	Nickname	Left for	Current conference
University of Iowa	Iowa City, Iowa	1847	1907	1908	Public	Hawkeyes	Big Ten	Big Ten

==== Former associate members ====
Institution	Location	Membership Type	Primary Conference	Joined	Left	Nickname
University of Cincinnati (Note: After Iowa's departure the Missouri Valley made a brief scheduling alliance with independent Cincinnati)	Cincinnati, Ohio	Basketball	Missouri Valley	1908	1909	Bearcats

== See also ==
- 1927 Missouri Valley Intercollegiate Athletic Association football season
