= 1917–18 NCAA men's basketball season =

Men's collegiate basketball season

- Helms National Champions: Syracuse (retroactive selection in 1943)
- Player of the Year (Helms): Bill Chandler, Wisconsin (retroactive selection in 1944)

The 1917–18 NCAA men's basketball season began in December 1917, progressed through the regular season, and concluded in March 1918.

== Season headlines ==
- The Pacific Coast Conference did not play as a basketball conference during the 1917–18 season. Its members competed as independents.
- In February 1943, the Helms Athletic Foundation retroactively selected Syracuse as its national champion for the 1917–18 season.
- In 1995, the Premo-Porretta Power Poll retroactively selected Syracuse as its top-ranked team for the 1917–18 season.

== Conference membership changes ==
School	Former Conference	New Conference
Michigan Wolverines	No basketball program	Big Ten Conference
Oklahoma A&M Aggies	Independent	Southwest Conference
Stanford Indians	Pacific Coast Conference	Independent
Washington State Cougars	Pacific Coast Conference	Independent

== Regular season ==
=== Conferences ===
==== Conference winners ====
Conference	Regular Season Winner	Conference Player of the Year	Conference Tournament	Tournament Venue (City)	Tournament Winner
Big Ten Conference	Wisconsin	None selected	No Tournament		
Eastern Intercollegiate Basketball League	Penn	None selected	No Tournament		
Missouri Valley Intercollegiate Athletic Association	Missouri	None selected	No Tournament		
Pacific Coast Conference	Did not play as conference				
Rocky Mountain Athletic Conference	Colorado		No Tournament		
Southwest Conference	Rice	None selected	No Tournament		

==== Conference standings ====
1917–18 Big Ten Conference men's basketball standings
	Conf.				Overall
Team	W		L	PCT	W		L	PCT
Wisconsin	9	–	3	.750	14	–	3	.824
Minnesota	7	–	3	.700	13	–	3	.813
Northwestern	5	–	3	.625	7	–	4	.636
Illinois	6	–	6	.500	9	–	6	.600
Chicago	6	–	6	.500	14	–	10	.583
Purdue	5	–	5	.500	11	–	5	.688
Ohio State	5	–	5	.500	12	–	7	.632
Indiana	3	–	3	.500	10	–	4	.714
Iowa	4	–	6	.400	6	–	8	.429
Michigan	0	–	10	.000	6	–	12	.333

1917–18 Eastern Intercollegiate Basketball League standings
	Conf.				Overall
Team	W		L	PCT	W		L	PCT
Penn	9	–	1	.900	18	–	2	.900
Princeton	8	–	2	.800	12	–	3	.800
Cornell	7	–	3	.700	11	–	4	.733
Yale	4	–	6	.400	7	–	14	.333
Columbia	2	–	8	.200	4	–	9	.308
Dartmouth	0	–	10	.000	0	–	26	.000

1917–18 Missouri Valley Intercollegiate Athletic Association men's basketball standings
	Conf.				Overall
Team	W		L	PCT	W		L	PCT
Missouri	15	–	1	.938	17	–	1	.944
Kansas State	10	–	5	.667	12	–	5	.706
Kansas	9	–	8	.529	10	–	8	.556
Washington University	4	–	8	.333	9	–	8	.529
Nebraska	4	–	5	.444	7	–	7	.500
Iowa State	1	–	6	.143	6	–	10	.375
Drake	0	–	10	.000	1	–	15	.063

1917–18 Rocky Mountain Conference standings
	Conf.				Overall
Team	W		L	PCT	W		L	PCT
Colorado	6	–	1	.857	9	–	2	.818
Denver	3	–	3	.500	3	–	4	.429
Colorado Agricultural	2	–	3	.400	5	–	5	.500
Colorado Mines	1	–	5	.167	3	–	5	.375
Colorado College		–		–	3	–	2	.600

1917–18 Southwest Conference men's basketball standings
	Conf.				Overall
Team	W		L	PCT	W		L	PCT
Rice	7	–	3	.700	10	–	4	.714
Texas	8	–	4	.667	14	–	5	.737
Texas A&M	7	–	7	.500	9	–	9	.500
Baylor	2	–	7	.222	2	–	15	.118
Oklahoma A&M	1	–	4	.200	6	–	10	.375

=== Independents ===
A total of 127 college teams played as major independents. Among independents that played at least 10 games, Creighton (14–0), Miami of Ohio (10–0), North Dakota (15–0), Oregon Agricultural (15–0), Saint Mary's (15–0), the Stevens Institute (14–0), and Wisconsin–Stevens Point (14–0) were undefeated, and Syracuse (16–1) finished with the most wins.

1917–18 NCAA men's basketball independents standings
	Conf.				Overall
Team	W		L	PCT	W		L	PCT
Canisius		–		–	5	–	0	1.000
Creighton		–		–	14	–	0	1.000
Miami (Ohio)		–		–	10	–	0	1.000
Oregon Agricultural		–		–	15	–	0	1.000
Rhode Island State		–		–	3	–	0	1.000
Saint Mary's (Calif.)		–		–	15	–	0	1.000
Santa Clara		–		–	4	–	0	1.000
Stevens Institute		–		–	14	–	0	1.000
Utah State		–		–	9	–	0	1.000
Wisconsin–Stevens Point		–		–	14	–	0	1.000
Syracuse		–		–	16	–	1	.941
Union (N.Y.)		–		–	14	–	1	.933
Idaho		–		–	12	–	1	.923
Louisiana State		–		–	12	–	1	.923
Penn State		–		–	12	–	1	.923
Oklahoma		–		–	11	–	1	.917
Central (Ky.)		–		–	10	–	1	.909
Navy		–		–	14	–	2	.875
Virginia		–		–	7	–	1	.875
Geneva		–		–	13	–	2	.867
Georgia		–		–	6	–	1	.857
Washington & Jefferson		–		–	10	–	2	.833
Kentucky		–		–	9	–	2	.818
North Carolina State		–		–	13	–	3	.813
Springfield (Mass.)		–		–	13	–	3	.813
California		–		–	8	–	2	.800
Bucknell		–		–	11	–	3	.786
Tempe Normal		–		–	14	–	4	.778
Valparaiso		–		–	7	–	2	.778
Fordham		–		–	10	–	3	.769
Kalamazoo		–		–	10	–	3	.769
Boston		–		–	6	–	2	.750
Buffalo		–		–	6	–	2	.750
Franklin		–		–	9	–	3	.750
North Carolina		–		–	9	–	3	.750
North Central		–		–	9	–	3	.750
Tulane		–		–	6	–	2	.750
Virginia Tech		–		–	15	–	5	.750
Stanford		–		–	11	–	4	.733
Marietta		–		–	8	–	3	.727
Niagara		–		–	8	–	3	.727
Detroit		–		–	13	–	5	.722
St. Joseph's		–		–	5	–	2	.714
CCNY		–		–	7	–	3	.700
New Mexico A&M		–		–	7	–	3	.700
Akron		–		–	9	–	4	.692
Carleton		–		–	9	–	4	.692
Central Missouri		–		–	9	–	4	.692
Lafayette		–		–	15	–	7	.682
Army		–		–	8	–	4	.667
Trinity (N.C.)		–		–	10	–	5	.667
Vanderbilt		–		–	6	–	3	.667
Western State Normal		–		–	8	–	4	.667
Wyoming		–		–	4	–	2	.667
Grinnell		–		–	7	–	4	.636
Roanoke		–		–	7	–	4	.636
Brigham Young		–		–	5	–	3	.625
Rutgers		–		–	5	–	3	.625
Seton Hall		–		–	8	–	5	.615
South Carolina		–		–	8	–	5	.615
Southwestern (Kan.)		–		–	8	–	5	.615
Arizona		–		–	3	–	2	.600
Bowling Green State		–		–	6	–	4	.600
Clemson		–		–	3	–	2	.600
North Dakota Agricultural		–		–	9	–	6	.600
Davidson		–		–	7	–	5	.583
Denison		–		–	7	–	5	.583
Millsaps		–		–	7	–	5	.583
Swarthmore		–		–	7	–	5	.583
Georgetown		–		–	8	–	6	.571
SMU		–		–	5	–	4	.556
Utah		–		–	5	–	4	.556
Lehigh		–		–	11	–	9	.550
Mount Union		–		–	7	–	6	.538
Temple		–		–	8	–	7	.533
Wabash		–		–	8	–	7	.533
Duquesne		–		–	4	–	4	.500
Indiana State		–		–	8	–	8	.500
Montana		–		–	6	–	6	.500
Nevada		–		–	3	–	3	.500
St. John's (N.Y.)		–		–	8	–	8	.500
Texas Christian		–		–	4	–	4	.500
VMI		–		–	6	–	6	.500
Millikin		–		–	10	–	11	.476
DePauw		–		–	7	–	8	.467
Catholic		–		–	5	–	6	.455
Delaware		–		–	5	–	6	.455
Washington and Lee		–		–	5	–	6	.455
Bradley		–		–	6	–	8	.429
Colgate		–		–	9	–	12	.429
Louisville		–		–	3	–	4	.429
Manhattan		–		–	6	–	8	.429
Northern Colorado		–		–	3	–	4	.429
Gettysburg		–		–	5	–	7	.417
Auburn		–		–	2	–	3	.400
Beloit		–		–	4	–	6	.400
Marquette		–		–	4	–	6	.400
Michigan State		–		–	6	–	10	.375
Washington State		–		–	7	–	12	.368
Pittsburgh		–		–	5	–	9	.357
William & Mary		–		–	6	–	11	.353
Dayton		–		–	2	–	4	.333
Notre Dame		–		–	2	–	4	.333
Ohio		–		–	4	–	8	.333
Richmond		–		–	3	–	6	.333
Toledo		–		–	2	–	4	.333
Washington		–		–	4	–	8	.333
Wooster		–		–	4	–	9	.308
Alabama		–		–	2	–	5	.286
Oregon		–		–	3	–	8	.273
Cincinnati		–		–	2	–	6	.250
Montana State		–		–	2	–	6	.250
Tennessee		–		–	3	–	9	.250
Wake Forest		–		–	4	–	12	.250
West Virginia		–		–	4	–	13	.235
Fairmount		–		–	3	–	10	.231
Grove City		–		–	2	–	7	.222
Saint Louis		–		–	3	–	12	.200
Washburn		–		–	2	–	9	.182
Tulsa		–		–	1	–	5	.167
Connecticut		–		–	1	–	6	.143
New York University		–		–	1	–	10	.091
Butler		–		–	0	–	6	.000
The Citadel		–		–	0	–	1	.000
Muhlenberg		–		–	0	–	7	.000
Southern California		–		–	0	–	2	.000

== Awards ==
=== Helms College Basketball All-Americans ===
The practice of selecting a Consensus All-American Team did not begin until the 1928–29 season. The Helms Athletic Foundation later retroactively selected a list of All-Americans for the 1917–18 season.

Player	Team
Earl Anderson	Illinois
Bill Chandler	Wisconsin
Harold Gillen	Minnesota
Hubert Peck	Penn
Craig Ruby	Missouri
Joseph Schwarzer	Syracuse
Eber Simpson	Wisconsin
Alfred Sorenson	Washington State
George Sweeney	Penn
Gene Vidal	Army

=== Major player of the year awards ===
- Helms Player of the Year: Bill Chandler, Wisconsin (retroactive selection in 1944)

== Coaching changes ==
A number of teams changed coaches during the season and after it ended.

Team	Former Coach	Interim Coach	New Coach	Reason
Alabama	B. L. Noojin		Yancey Goodall	
Bradley	Fred Brown		Harold Olsen	
Bucknell	Malcolm Musser		Haps Benfer	
Butler	G. Cullen Thomas		Joe Mullane	
California	Walter Christie		Bill Hollander	
Cincinnati	Whitelaw Morrison		Boyd Chambers	
The Citadel	Harry J. O'Brien		C. F. Myers	
Colorado	Bob Evans		Enoch J. Mills	Evans left to coach Stanford.
Columbia	John Murray		Fred Dawson	
Delaware	William McAvoy		Burton Shipley	
Denver	John Fike		Charles Wingender	
Drake	S. W. Hobbs		M. B. Banks	
Georgia	Alfred Scott		Earl Ford	
Kentucky	Stanley A. Boles		Thomas Andrew Gill	
Louisiana State	Charles C. Stroud		R. E. Edmonds	
Missouri	Walter Meanwell		John F. Miller	
Navy	James Colliflower		Billy Lush	
NC State	Harry Hartsell		Tal Stafford	
North Dakota	Thomas Andrew Gill		Harry Caldwell	Gill left to coach at Kentucky
North Dakota Agricultural	Paul J. Davis		Curly Movold	
Northwestern	J. Norman Elliott		Tom Robinson	
Ohio	M. B. Banks		Frank Gullum	Banks left to coach Drake.
Oregon	Bill Hayward		Dean Walker	
Oregon Agricultural	Howard Ray		Homer Woodson Hargiss	
Purdue	J. J. Maloney		Ward Lambert	
Rhode Island State	James A. Baldwin		Mysterious Walker	Walker also took on the athletic director role from Baldwin.
Richmond	Dave E. Satterfield Jr.		Robert C. Marshall	
Saint Mary's (Calif.)	Otto Rittler		Percival Ritchie	
Santa Clara	Terry Desmond		Norbert Keefe	
Southern California	Dean Cromwell		Motts Blair	
Stanford	Russell T. Wilson		Bob Evans	
Toledo	Darrell Fox		Sam Monetta	
Trinity (N.C.)	Charles Doak		Henry Cole	
Tulane	Clark Shaughnessy		M. A. Moenck	
Vanderbilt	Ralph Palmer		Ray Morrison	
Wake Forest	E. T. MacDonnell		Irving E. Carlyle	
