= List of Northwestern Wildcats men's basketball head coaches =

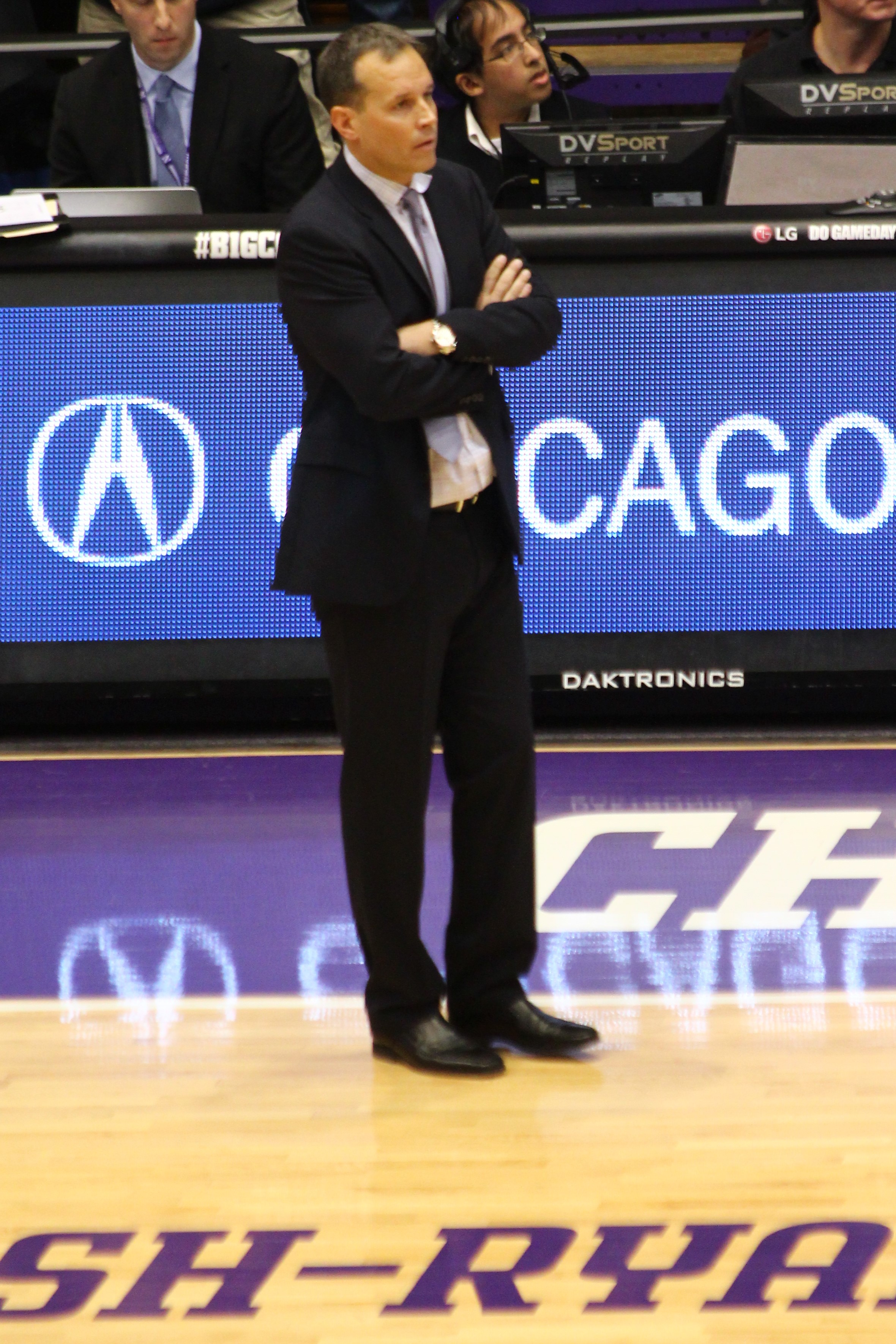
Chris Collins, the current head coach of the Northwestern Wildcats.

The following is a list of Northwestern Wildcats men's basketball head coaches. There have been 24 head coaches of the Wildcats in their 118-season history.

Northwestern's current head coach is Chris Collins. He was hired as the Wildcats' head coach in March 2013, replacing Bill Carmody, who was fired at the end of the 2012–13 season.

No.	Tenure	Coach	Years	Record	Pct.
1	1904–1905	Tom Holland	1	2–2	.500
2	1906–1910	Louis Gillesby	4	4–28	.125
3	1910–1911	Stuart Templeton	1	3–15	.167
4	1911–1912	Charles Hammett	1	4–9	.308
5	1912–1914	Dennis Grady	2	25–10	.714
6	1914–1917	Fred J. Murphy	3	28–24	.538
7	1917–1918; 1919–1920	J. Norman Elliott	2	9–11	.450
8	1918–1919	Tom Robinson	1	7–6	.538
9	1920–1921	Ray Elder	1	2–12	.143
10	1921–1922	Dana Evans	1	7–11	.389
11	1922–1927	Maury Kent	5	19–62	.235
12	1927–1950	Dutch Lonborg	23	236–203–1	.538
13	1950–1952	Harold Olsen	2	19–25	.432
14	1952–1957	Waldo A. Fisher	5	35–75	.318
15	1957–1963	Bill Rohr	6	66–70	.485
16	1963–1969 (Note: Glass resigned with six games remaining in the 1968–69 season, and was replaced by Brad Snyder on a permanent basis.)	Larry Glass	6	61–71	.462
17	1969–1973	Brad Snyder	5	30–71	.297
18	1973–1978	Tex Winter	5	44–87	.336
19	1978–1986	Rich Falk	8	80–142	.360
20	1986–1993	Bill Foster	7	54–141	.277
21	1993–1997	Ricky Byrdsong	4	34–78	.304
22	1997–2000	Kevin O'Neill	3	30–56	.349
23	2000–2013	Bill Carmody	13	192–210	.478
24	2013–present	Chris Collins	11	178–174	.506
Totals		24 coaches	119 seasons	1,170–1,593–1	.423
Records updated through end of 2023–24 season Source
