= List of Northwestern Wildcats men's basketball seasons =

This is a list of seasons completed by the Northwestern Wildcats men's basketball program since the team's inception.

== Seasons ==
Record table
| Season | Coach | Overall | Conference | Standing | Postseason |
|---|---|---|---|---|---|
Thomas Holland (Western Conference) (1904–1905)
| 1904–05 | Thomas Holland | 2–2 | | | |
| Thomas Holland: | | 2–2 (.500) | 0–0 (–) | | |
Louis Gillesby (Western Conference) (1906–1910)
| 1906–07 | Louis Gillesby | 1–5 | | | |
| 1907–08 | Louis Gillesby | 2–7 | | | |
| 1908–09 | Louis Gillesby | 1–7 | 1–4 | 7th | |
| 1909–10 | Louis Gillesby | 0–9 | 0–9 | 8th | |
| Louis Gillesby: | | 4–28 (.125) | 1–13 (.071) | | |
Stuart Templeton (Western Conference) (1910–1911)
| 1910–11 | Stuart Templeton | 3–15 | 1–12 | 8th | |
| Stuart Templeton: | | 3–15 (.167) | 1–12 (.077) | | |
Charles Hammett (Western Conference) (1911–1912)
| 1911–12 | Charles Hammett | 4–9 | 0–8 | 8th | |
| Charles Hammett: | | 4–9 (.308) | 0–8 (.000) | | |
Dennis Grady (Western Conference) (1912–1914)
| 1912–13 | Dennis Grady | 14–4 | 7–2 | 2nd | |
| 1913–14 | Dennis Grady | 11–6 | 6–5 | 5th | |
| Dennis Grady: | | 25–10 (.714) | 13–7 (.650) | | |
Fred Murphy (Western Conference) (1914–1917)
| 1914–15 | Fred Murphy | 11–8 | 5–5 | T–4th | |
| 1915–16 | Fred Murphy | 14–5 | 9–3 | T–2nd | |
| 1916–17 | Fred Murphy | 3–11 | 2–10 | 8th | |
| Fred Murphy: | | 28–24 (.538) | 16–18 (.471) | | |
Norman Elliott (Western Conference) (1917–1918)
| 1917–18 | Norman Elliott | 7–4 | 5–3 | 3rd | |
Thomas Robinson (Western Conference) (1918–1919)
| 1918–19 | Thomas Robinson | 6–6 | 6–4 | 3rd | |
| Thomas Robinson: | | 6–6 (.500) | 6–4 (.600) | | |
Norman Elliott (Western Conference) (1919–1920)
| 1919–20 | Norman Elliott | 3–7 | 2–6 | T–7th | |
| Norman Elliott: | | 10–11 (.476) | 7–9 (.438) | | |
Ray Elder (Western Conference) (1920–1921)
| 1920–21 | Ray Elder | 2–12 | 1–11 | 10th | |
| Ray Elder: | | 2–12 (.143) | 1–11 (.083) | | |
Dana Evans (Western Conference) (1921–1922)
| 1921–22 | Dana Evans | 7–11 | 3–9 | 10th | |
| Dana Evans: | | 7–11 (.389) | 3–9 (.250) | | |
Maury Kent (Western Conference) (1922–1927)
| 1922–23 | Maury Kent | 5–11 | 3–9 | 8th | |
| 1923–24 | Maury Kent | 0–16 | 0–12 | 10th | |
| 1924–25 | Maury Kent | 6–10 | 4–8 | 8th | |
| 1925–26 | Maury Kent | 5–12 | 3–9 | 10th | |
| 1926–27 | Maury Kent | 3–14 | 1–11 | T–9th | |
| Maury Kent: | | 19–62 (.235) | 11–49 (.183) | | |
Arthur "Dutch" Lonborg (Western Conference) (1927–1950)
| 1927–28 | Arthur "Dutch" Lonborg | 12–5 | 9–3 | T–3rd | |
| 1928–29 | Arthur Lonborg | 12–5 | 7–5 | 4th | |
| 1929–30 | Arthur Lonborg | 8–8 | 6–6 | 6th | |
| 1930–31 | Arthur Lonborg | 16–1 | 11–1 | 1st | Helms National Champion |
| 1931–32 | Arthur Lonborg | 13–5 | 9–3 | T–2nd | |
| 1932–33 | Arthur Lonborg | 15–4 | 10–2 | T–1st | |
| 1933–34 | Arthur Lonborg | 11–8 | 8–4 | T–2nd | |
| 1934–35 | Arthur Lonborg | 10–10 | 3–9 | 8th | |
| 1935–36 | Arthur Lonborg | 13–6 | 7–5 | T–3rd | |
| 1936–37 | Arthur Lonborg | 11–9–1^{[Note A]} | 4–8 | 7th | |
| 1937–38 | Arthur Lonborg | 10–10 | 7–5 | T–3rd | |
| 1938–39 | Arthur Lonborg | 7–13 | 5–7 | 6th | |
| 1939–40 | Arthur Lonborg | 13–7 | 7–5 | T–4th | |
| 1940–41 | Arthur Lonborg | 7–11 | 3–9 | 9th | |
| 1941–42 | Arthur Lonborg | 8–13 | 5–10 | T–7th | |
| 1942–43 | Arthur Lonborg | 8–9 | 7–5 | 3rd | |
| 1943–44 | Arthur Lonborg | 12–7 | 8–4 | T–4th | |
| 1944–45 | Arthur Lonborg | 7–12 | 4–8 | T–6th | |
| 1945–46 | Arthur Lonborg | 15–5 | 8–4 | T–3rd | |
| 1946–47 | Arthur Lonborg | 7–13 | 2–10 | 9th | |
| 1947–48 | Arthur Lonborg | 6–14 | 3–9 | T–8th | |
| 1948–49 | Arthur Lonborg | 5–16 | 2–10 | 9th | |
| 1949–50 | Arthur Lonborg | 10–12 | 3–9 | T–8th | |
| Arthur "Dutch" Lonborg: | | 236–203–1 (.538) | 138–141 (.495) | | |
Harold Olsen (Western Conference) (1950–1952)
| 1950–51 | Harold Olsen | 12–10 | 7–7 | T–4th | |
| 1951–52 | Harold Olsen | 7–15 | 4–10 | T–8th | |
| Harold Olsen: | | 19–25 (.432) | 11–17 (.393) | | |
Waldo Fisher (Western Conference) (1952–1953)
| 1952–53 | Waldo Fisher | 6–16 | 5–13 | 8th | |
Waldo Fisher (Big Ten Conference) (1953–1957)
| 1953–54 | Waldo Fisher | 9–13 | 6–8 | T–5th | |
| 1954–55 | Waldo Fisher | 12–10 | 7–7 | 5th | |
| 1955–56 | Waldo Fisher | 2–20 | 1–13 | 10th | |
| 1956–57 | Waldo Fisher | 6–16 | 2–12 | 10th | |
| Waldo Fisher: | | 35–75 (.318) | 21–53 (.284) | | |
William Rohr (Big Ten Conference) (1957–1963)
| 1957–58 | William Rohr | 13–9 | 8–6 | T–4th | |
| 1958–59 | William Rohr | 15–7 | 8–6 | T–2nd | |
| 1959–60 | William Rohr | 11–12 | 8–6 | T–3rd | |
| 1960–61 | William Rohr | 10–12 | 6–8 | 6th | |
| 1961–62 | William Rohr | 8–15 | 3–11 | T–9th | |
| 1962–63 | William Rohr | 9–15 | 6–8 | 7th | |
| William Rohr: | | 66–70 (.485) | 39–45 (.464) | | |
Larry Glass (Big Ten Conference) (1963–1969)
| 1963–64 | Larry Glass | 8–13 | 6–8 | T–6th | |
| 1964–65 | Larry Glass | 7–17 | 3–11 | 9th | |
| 1965–66 | Larry Glass | 12–12 | 7–7 | T–5th | |
| 1966–67 | Larry Glass | 11–11 | 7–7 | T–5th | |
| 1967–68 | Larry Glass | 13–10 | 8–6 | 4th | |
| 1968–69 | Larry Glass; Brad Snyder | 14–10^{[Note B]} | 6–8 | T–5th | |
| Larry Glass: | | 61–71 (.462) | 33–45 (.423) | | |
Brad Snyder (Big Ten Conference) (1969–1973)
| 1969–70 | Brad Snyder | 9–15 | 4–10 | 9th | |
| 1970–71 | Brad Snyder | 7–17 | 3–11 | 10th | |
| 1971–72 | Brad Snyder | 5–18 | 3–11 | 10th | |
| 1972–73 | Brad Snyder | 5–19 | 2–12 | 10th | |
| Brad Snyder: | | 30–71 (.297) | 16–46 (.258) | | |
Tex Winter (Big Ten Conference) (1973–1978)
| 1973–74 | Tex Winter | 9–15 | 3–11 | 9th | |
| 1974–75 | Tex Winter | 6–20 | 4–14 | T–9th | |
| 1975–76 | Tex Winter | 12–15 | 7–11 | T–7th | |
| 1976–77 | Tex Winter | 9–18 | 7–11 | T–7th | |
| 1977–78 | Tex Winter | 8–19 | 4–14 | T–9th | |
| Tex Winter: | | 42–89 (.321) | 25–61 (.291) | | |
Rich Falk (Big Ten Conference) (1978–1986)
| 1978–79 | Rich Falk | 6–21 | 2–16 | 10th | |
| 1979–80 | Rich Falk | 10–17 | 5–13 | 10th | |
| 1980–81 | Rich Falk | 9–18 | 3–15 | 10th | |
| 1981–82 | Rich Falk | 9–18 | 3–15 | 10th | |
| 1982–83 | Rich Falk | 18–12 | 8–10 | 8th | NIT second round |
| 1983–84 | Rich Falk | 14–14 | 7–11 | 7th | |
| 1984–85 | Rich Falk | 6–22 | 2–16 | 10th | |
| 1985–86 | Rich Falk | 8–20 | 2–16 | 10th | |
| Rich Falk: | | 77–144 (.348) | 32–112 (.222) | | |
Bill Foster (Big Ten Conference) (1986–1993)
| 1986–87 | Bill Foster | 7–21 | 2–16 | T–9th | |
| 1987–88 | Bill Foster | 7–21 | 2–16 | 10th | |
| 1988–89 | Bill Foster | 9–19 | 2–16 | 10th | |
| 1989–90 | Bill Foster | 9–19 | 2–16 | 10th | |
| 1990–91 | Bill Foster | 5–23 | 0–18 | 10th | |
| 1991–92 | Bill Foster | 9–19 | 2–16 | 10th | |
| 1992–93 | Bill Foster | 8–19 | 3–15 | 10th | |
| Bill Foster: | | 54–141 (.277) | 13–113 (.103) | | |
Ricky Byrdsong (Big Ten Conference) (1993–1997)
| 1993–94 | Ricky Byrdsong | 15–14 | 5–13 | T–10th | NIT second round |
| 1994–95 | Ricky Byrdsong | 5–22 | 1–17 | 11th | |
| 1995–96 | Ricky Byrdsong | 7–20 | 2–16 | 11th | |
| 1996–97 | Ricky Byrdsong | 7–22 | 2–16 | 11th | |
| Ricky Byrdsong: | | 34–78 (.304) | 10–62 (.139) | | |
Kevin O'Neill (Big Ten Conference) (1997–2000)
| 1997–98 | Kevin O'Neill | 10–17 | 3–13 | 9th | |
| 1998–99 | Kevin O'Neill | 15–14 | 6–10 | 8th | NIT first round |
| 1999–00 | Kevin O'Neill | 5–25 | 0–16 | 11th | |
| Kevin O'Neill: | | 30–56 (.349) | 19–39 (.328) | | |
Bill Carmody (Big Ten Conference) (2000–2013)
| 2000–01 | Bill Carmody | 11–19 | 3–13 | 11th | |
| 2001–02 | Bill Carmody | 16–13 | 7–9 | 7th | |
| 2002–03 | Bill Carmody | 12–17 | 3–13 | 10th | |
| 2003–04 | Bill Carmody | 14–15 | 8–8 | T–5th | |
| 2004–05 | Bill Carmody | 15–16 | 6–10 | 8th | |
| 2005–06 | Bill Carmody | 14–15 | 6–10 | T–8th | |
| 2006–07 | Bill Carmody | 13–18 | 2–14 | T–10th | |
| 2007–08 | Bill Carmody | 8–22 | 1–17 | 11th | |
| 2008–09 | Bill Carmody | 17–14 | 8–10 | 9th | NIT first round |
| 2009–10 | Bill Carmody | 20–14 | 7–11 | T–7th | NIT first round |
| 2010–11 | Bill Carmody | 20–14 | 7–11 | 8th | NIT Quarterfinal |
| 2011–12 | Bill Carmody | 19–14 | 8–10 | T–7th | NIT second round |
| 2012–13 | Bill Carmody | 13–19 | 4–14 | 11th | |
| Bill Carmody: | | 192–210 (.478) | 70–150 (.318) | | |
Chris Collins (Big Ten Conference) (2013–Current)
| 2013–14 | Chris Collins | 14–19 | 6–12 | 11th | |
| 2014–15 | Chris Collins | 15–17 | 6–12 | 10th | |
| 2015–16 | Chris Collins | 20–12 | 8–10 | 9th | |
| 2016–17 | Chris Collins | 24–12 | 10–8 | T–5th | NCAA Division I second round |
| 2017–18 | Chris Collins | 15–17 | 6–12 | 10th | |
| 2018–19 | Chris Collins | 13–19 | 4–16 | 14th | |
| 2019–20 | Chris Collins | 8–23 | 3–17 | 13th | No postseason held due to COVID-19 |
| 2020–21 | Chris Collins | 9–15 | 6–13 | 12th | |
| 2021–22 | Chris Collins | 15–16 | 7–13 | T–11th | |
| 2022–23 | Chris Collins | 22–12 | 12–8 | T–2nd | NCAA Division I second round |
| 2023–24 | Chris Collins | 22–12 | 12–8 | T–3rd | NCAA Division I second round |
| 2024–25 | Chris Collins | 17–16 | 7–13 | T–12th | |
| 2025–26 | Chris Collins | 15–19 | 5–15 | T–15th | |
| Chris Collins: | | 207–208 (.499) | 90–157 (.364) | | |
| Total: | | 1,150–1,573–1 (.422) | | | |
National champion Postseason invitational champion Conference regular season champion Conference regular season and conference tournament champion Division regular season champion Division regular season and conference tournament champion Conference tournament champion

^A.Due to a scoring error during the Notre Dame game in 1936, a game which was originally ruled a 21–20 win for Notre Dame was determined to be a tie when it was discovered Notre Dame had received one more point than they had actually scored. Notre Dame returned to the court to finish the game, but Northwestern refused to return to the court. The Wildcats left the building and the game was deemed a tie.
^B.Larry Glass left Northwestern after 18 games in 1969. Brad Snyder coached the remaining six games.
