= Henry Coles =

Henry Coles may refer to:

- Henry Coles (footballer) (born 1951), Australian rules footballer
- Henry Beaumont Coles (1794–1862), British politician

== See also ==
- Henry Cole (disambiguation)
