= 1918 NCAA Men's Basketball All-Americans =

- Awarded for: 1917–18 NCAA men's basketball season

The 1918 College Basketball All-American team, as chosen retroactively by the Helms Athletic Foundation. The player highlighted in gold was chosen as the Helms Foundation College Basketball Player of the Year retroactively in 1944.

Player	Team
Earl Anderson	Illinois
William Chandler	Wisconsin
Harold Gillen	Minnesota
Hubert Peck	Penn
Craig Ruby	Missouri
Joe Schwarzer	Syracuse
Eber Simpson	Wisconsin
Alfred Sorenson	Washington State
George Sweeney	Penn
Gene Vidal	Army

== See also ==
- 1917–18 NCAA men's basketball season
