= Earl Anderson =

Earl Anderson may refer to:

- Big Dad Ritch (James Richard Earl Anderson), lead vocalist for American red dirt metal band Texas Hippie Coalition
- Earl Anderson (ice hockey) (born 1951), American ice hockey player
- Earl E. Anderson (1919–2015), American Marine Corps general
- Earl William Anderson (1897–1965), American basketball player
