= Elmer Mitchell =

American football and basketball coach

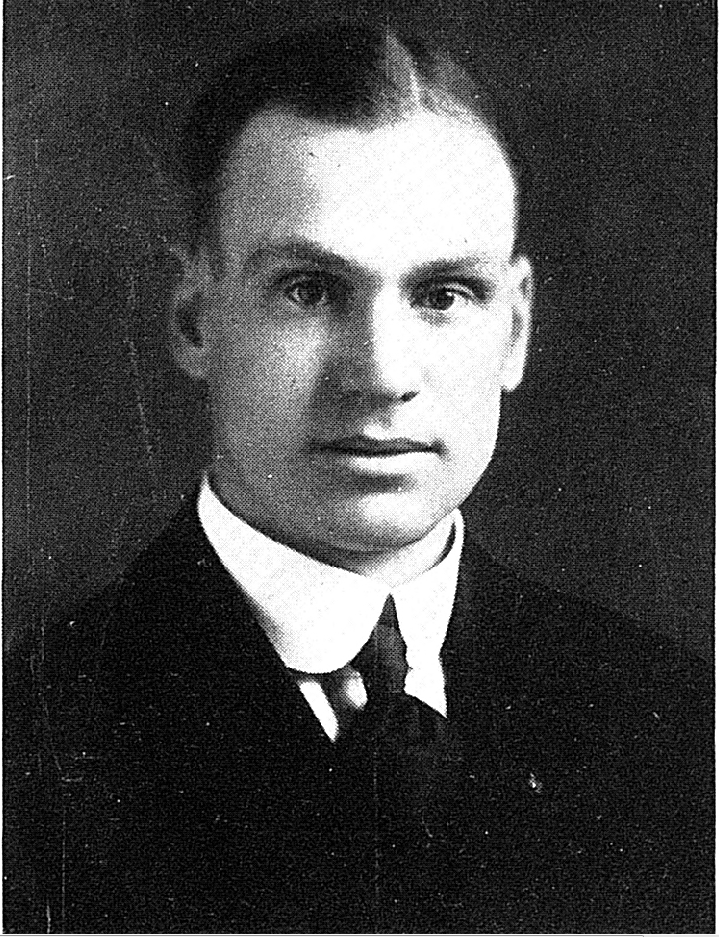

Biographical details
- Born: September 6, 1889; Negaunee, Michigan, U.S.
- Died: June 15, 1983 (aged 93); Ann Arbor, Michigan, U.S.

Playing career

Baseball
- 1910–1912: Michigan
- Positions: Center fielder, first baseman

Coaching career (HC unless noted)

Football
- 1915–1916: Michigan State Normal

Basketball
- 1915–1917: Michigan State Normal
- 1917–1919: Michigan

Head coaching record
- Overall: 5–4–2 (football); 47–25 (basketball)

Elmer Dayton Mitchell (September 6, 1889 – June 15, 1983) was an American football and basketball coach in Michigan who is considered the father of intramural sports. He was the first varsity basketball coach at the University of Michigan at Ann Arbor and the founder of that school's intramural sports program. Through 2010, he has the highest winning percentage of any head coach in Eastern Michigan Eagles men's basketball history.

Mitchell also coached at Union High School in Grand Rapids, Michigan, received a Medal of Honor from Czechoslovakia for his work in the field of intramural athletics., and was elected into the National Academy of Kinesiology (née American Academy of Physical Education) in 1930 as Fellow #26.

== Early years ==
Mitchell attended the University of Michigan, where he played on the varsity baseball team for three years, under head coach and eventual Baseball Hall of Fame member Branch Rickey. He usually played center field, or occasionally first base, and he was the team captain in 1912, his senior year.

Immediately after graduating from Michigan, Mitchell managed the Negaunee baseball team, in Michigan's Upper Peninsula, for a summer. In the fall of 1912, he was hired as a teacher and coach at Union High School, where "[h]e developed state title contenders in baseball, football, and basketball". In the 1914–15 season, his last at the high school, the basketball team posted a 14–1 record.

== Coaching career ==
=== Michigan State Normal ===
In 1915, Mitchell was hired as an assistant professor of physical education at Michigan State Normal College (MSNC)—now known as Eastern Michigan University—in Ypsilanti, Michigan. While at MSNC, Mitchell taught physical education courses geared toward the school's future teachers, covering such topics as playground direction and athletic coaching, and he co-wrote a book about basketball. He was also a successful coach in basketball, football, and baseball.

Mitchell was the head football coach for the "Michigan State Normalites" for the 1915 and 1916 seasons, compiling a record of 5–4–2.

Mitchell was also the head coach for the "Michigan State Normalites" men's basketball team for the 1915–16 and 1916–17 seasons. His coaching record at the program was 25–5. Elton Rynearson was the team captain for the 1916–17 season, and succeeded Mitchell as the head coach. Although the team finished undefeated in Michigan Intercollegiate Athletic Association play in the 1916–17 season, Kalamazoo College was also undefeated, and is recorded by the MIAA as the champion for that year.

=== Michigan ===
As a result of public and alumni demand for a basketball team, the University of Michigan, in Ann Arbor, fielded a team of members of the then-current student body and achieved a 1–4 record for the 1908–09 season. However, after three years of demanding a basketball program the student body did not attend the games and the program was terminated due to low attendance. Basketball returned in 1917 in what was considered the inaugural season of varsity basketball, and Mitchell was hired to coach the team. The team finished 6–12 overall (0–10, Western Conference). The following year Mitchell led the team to a 16–8 (5–5) record. While at Michigan, Mitchell also coached the freshman football and baseball teams.

== Intramural sports ==
Mitchell is credited with instituting intramural athletics at the University of Michigan, and he was named the school's first Director of Intramural Athletics in 1919. Mitchell is considered the father of intramural sports and taught a class in intramural sports taken by William Wasson, founder of the National Intramural Association (NIA), the forerunner to the National Intramural and Recreational Sports Association (NIRSA).

Mitchell later wrote Intramural Athletics (ED Mitchell - AS Barnes, 1928) and Intramural Sports, and co-authored Intramural Sports with Pat Mueller.

== Head coaching record ==
=== Football ===
Year	Team	Overall	Conference	Standing	Bowl/playoffs
Michigan State Normal Normalites (Michigan Intercollegiate Athletic Association) (1915–1916)
1915	Michigan State Normal	4–2–1	1–1		
1916	Michigan State Normal	1–2–1	1–2		
Michigan State Normal:		5–4–2	2–3		
Total:		5–4–2			

=== Basketball ===
Record table
Season	Team	Overall	Conference	Standing	Postseason
Michigan State Normal Normalites (Michigan Intercollegiate Athletic Association) (1915–1917)
1915–16	Michigan State Normal	10–4	2–1		
1916–17	Michigan State Normal	15–1	6–0		
Michigan State Normal:		25–5 (.833)	8–1 (.889)		
Michigan Wolverines (Big Ten Conference) (1917–1919)
1917–18	Michigan	6–12	0–10	10th	
1918–19	Michigan	16–8	5–5	4th	
Michigan:		22–20 (.524)	5–15 (.250)		
Total:		47–25 (.653)			
