= 1917–18 Indiana Hoosiers men's basketball team =

American college basketball season

1917–18 Indiana Hoosiers men's basketball
- Conference: Big Ten Conference
- Record: 10–4 (3–3 Big Ten)
- Head coach: Dana Evans (1st season)
- Captain: Phillip Bowser
- Home arena: Men's Gymnasium

1917–18 Big Ten Conference men's basketball standings
	Conf.				Overall
Team	W		L	PCT	W		L	PCT
Wisconsin	9	–	3	.750	14	–	3	.824
Minnesota	7	–	3	.700	13	–	3	.813
Northwestern	5	–	3	.625	7	–	4	.636
Illinois	6	–	6	.500	9	–	6	.600
Chicago	6	–	6	.500	14	–	10	.583
Purdue	5	–	5	.500	11	–	5	.688
Ohio State	5	–	5	.500	12	–	7	.632
Indiana	3	–	3	.500	10	–	4	.714
Iowa	4	–	6	.400	6	–	8	.429
Michigan	0	–	10	.000	6	–	12	.333

The 1917–18 Indiana Hoosiers men's basketball team represented Indiana University. Their head coach was Dana Evans, who was in his first year. The team played its home games at the Men's Gymnasium in Bloomington, Indiana, and was a member of the Big Ten Conference.

The Hoosiers finished the regular season with an overall record of 10–4 and a conference record of 3–3, finishing 8th in the Big Ten Conference.

== Roster ==
Name	Position	Year	Hometown
Phillip Bowser	C	Sr.	Syracuse, Indiana
William Easton	F	So.	Bloomington, Indiana
James Ingles	G	Sr.	Indianapolis, Indiana
Urban Jeffries	F	So.	Rockville, Indiana
Ardith Phillips	G	So.	Amo, Indiana
Elliott Risley	F	N/A	Bloomington, Indiana
Willard Stahr	G	N/A	Hagerstown, Indiana
Edward Von Tress	G	So.	Vincennes, Indiana
William Zellar	F	Jr.	Brazil, Indiana

== Schedule/results ==
Date time, TV	Rank^{#}	Opponent^{#}	Result	Record	Site city, state
Regular season
12/7/1917*		Manchester	W 45–18	1–0	Men's Gymnasium; Bloomington, IN
12/14/1917*		Indiana Central	W 49–6	2–0	Men's Gymnasium; Bloomington, IN
12/20/1917*		DePauw	W 26–20	3–0	Men's Gymnasium; Bloomington, IN
1/11/1918*		Wabash	W 21–9	4–0	Men's Gymnasium; Bloomington, IN
1/18/1918		at Michigan	W 21–17	5–0 (1–0)	Waterman Gymnasium; Ann Arbor, MI
1/24/1918*		Detroit	W 24–15	6–0 (1–0)	Men's Gymnasium; Bloomington, IN
2/1/1918		at Ohio State	L 22–28	6–1 (1–1)	Columbus, OH
2/11/1918*		at DePauw	W 34–22	7–1 (1–1)	Greencastle, IN
2/12/1918		Ohio State	L 21–23	7–2 (1–2)	Men's Gymnasium; Bloomington, IN
2/16/1918		at Iowa	W 29–25	8–2 (2–2)	Iowa Armory; Iowa City, IA
2/18/1918*		at Wabash	L 18–28	8–3 (2–2)	Crawfordsville, IN
2/22/1918		Michigan	W 21–20	9–3 (3–2)	Men's Gymnasium; Bloomington, IN
3/1/1918*		Rose Poly	W 43–7	10–3 (3–2)	Men's Gymnasium; Bloomington, IN
3/8/1918		Iowa	L 11–13	10–4 (3–3)	Men's Gymnasium; Bloomington, IN
*Non-conference game. ^{#}Rankings from AP Poll. (#) Tournament seedings in parentheses.
