= Henry Cole =

Henry Cole may refer to:

- Sir Henry Cole (inventor) (1808–1882), English civil servant and inventor
- Henry Cole (priest) (c. 1500–1579/80), English Roman Catholic churchman and academic
- Henry Cole (minister) (1792–1858), Anglican curate
- Henry Cole (Conservative politician) (1809–1890), British politician, cricketer and army officer
- Henry A. Cole (1838–1909), American cavalry colonel of the American Civil War
- Henry Thomas Cole (1874–1880), British member of parliament for Penryn and Falmouth
- Henry Cole (illustrator) (born 1955), American author and illustrator of children's books
- Henry Cole (basketball), American basketball player and coach
- Henry Cole (presenter), British TV presenter, director and producer

== See also ==
- Harry Cole
