= Harry Cole =

Harry Cole may refer to:

- Harry Cole (journalist) (born 1986), British journalist
- Harold Cole (1906–1946), known as Harry, British soldier and traitor
- Harry A. Cole (1921–1999), Maryland jurist
- Harry A. Cole (born 1909), American chemist, inventor of Pine-Sol

== See also ==
- Henry Cole (disambiguation)
