= Timothy Y. Hewlett =

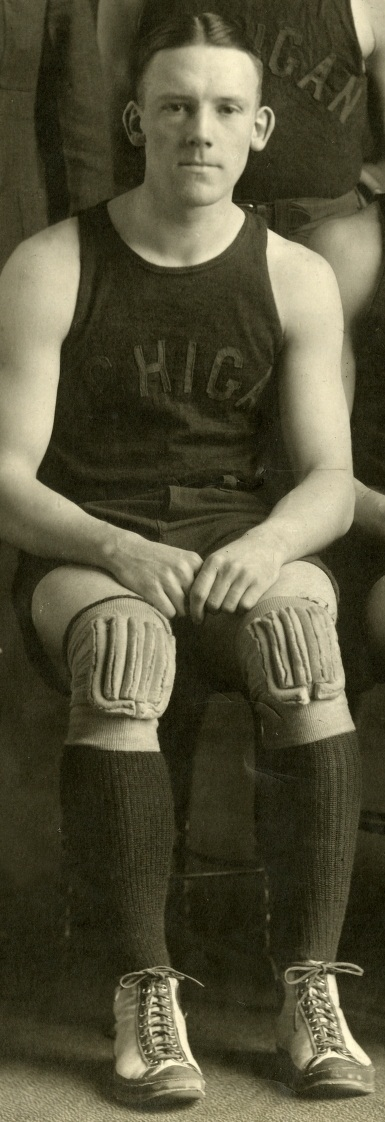

Personal information
- Born: July 29, 1896 Bath, New York, United States
- Died: August 6, 1986 (aged 90) Toledo, Ohio, United States

Career information
- College: Michigan

Timothy Younglove Hewlett (July 29, 1896 – August 6, 1986) was an American architect and artist.

Hewlett was born in Bath, New York in 1896. His father, Ambrose W. Hewlett, was the mayor of Bath. Hewlett attended the University of Michigan where he studied architecture and painting. While attending Michigan, he played two years as a forward on the school's basketball team. He was one of the leading scorers on the 1917–18 and 1918–19 Michigan men's basketball teams. He also competed in track at Michigan. Hewlett received a bachelor's degree in architecture from Michigan in 1919.

Hewlett began practicing as an architect in Detroit, then joined an architecture firm in Toledo, Ohio in the early 1920s. He worked as an architect in Ohio and Michigan from 1920 to 1975. In 1935, he formed the firm of Hewlett & Best with Thomas D. Best. Hewlett's works included several Coca-Cola bottling plants in Ohio and Michigan, the Toledo Stamping Company, the Calvary Episcopal Church in Belleair Beach, Florida, and numerous private homes in Toledo, Ottawa Hills, Perrysburg, and Maumee, Ohio, including the P. W. Hancock residence and the Dr. E. P. Gillette home. He became a member of the American Institute of Architects in 1930 and was elected as the president of its Toledo chapter in 1940.

In addition to his work as an architect, Hewlett was an artist whose watercolors have been exhibited at the Toledo Museum of Art and the Florida Gulf Coast Art Center. He died at age 90 in August 1986 at the Holly Glen Care Center in Toledo.
