= 1917–18 Illinois Fighting Illini men's basketball team =

American college basketball season

1917–18 Illinois Fighting Illini men's basketball
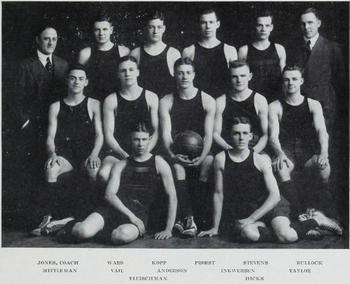
- Conference: Big Ten Conference
- Record: 9–6 (6–6 Big Ten)
- Head coach: Ralph Jones (6th season)
- Captain: George Halas
- Home arena: Kenney Gym

1917–18 Big Ten Conference men's basketball standings
	Conf.				Overall
Team	W		L	PCT	W		L	PCT
Wisconsin	9	–	3	.750	14	–	3	.824
Minnesota	7	–	3	.700	13	–	3	.813
Northwestern	5	–	3	.625	7	–	4	.636
Illinois	6	–	6	.500	9	–	6	.600
Chicago	6	–	6	.500	14	–	10	.583
Purdue	5	–	5	.500	11	–	5	.688
Ohio State	5	–	5	.500	12	–	7	.632
Indiana	3	–	3	.500	10	–	4	.714
Iowa	4	–	6	.400	6	–	8	.429
Michigan	0	–	10	.000	6	–	12	.333

The 1917–18 Illinois Fighting Illini men's basketball team represented the University of Illinois.

== Regular season ==
Under the direction of coach Ralph Jones, the 1917–18 season for the Illinois Fighting Illini men's basketball team, was unusual because World War I was happening in Europe. Co-captain George Halas, for example, left the team in January 1918 to help out with the war effort. In only the second season of having 10 members, the Big Ten Conference continued their 12-game schedule of home and road competitions. The Illini finished their season with an overall record of 9 wins and 6 losses and a 6-win 6-loss conference mark. The starting lineup included co-captain Earl Anderson and B.E. Mittleman at the forward positions, J.S. Probst and P.C. Taylor at center, and co-captain George Halas and Burt Ingwersen as guards. Anderson would be named a consensus All-American for the season.

=== Roster ===
1917–18 Illinois Fighting Illini men's basketball team
Players
Coaches

Pos.	#	Name	Height	Weight	Year	Hometown
F		Earl Anderson	—	—	Sr	Charleston, Illinois
G		George Halas (C)	—	—	Sr	Chicago, Illinois
C		John S. Probst	—	—	So	East Aurora, Illinois
C		Paul C. Taylor	—	—	So	New Orleans, Louisiana
G		Charles W. Vail	—	—	Fr	Chicago, Illinois
F		Burt Ingwersen	—	—	So	Urbana, Illinois
G/F		William K. Kopp	—	—	Fr	Beverly Farms, Massachusetts
F		Benjamin F. Mittleman	—	—	Jr	East Farmingdale, New York
F		James Garfield Stevens	—	—	Jr	Alfred, New York
G		Raymond Christian Haas	—	—	So	Evansville, Indiana

Head coach

- Ralph Jones (Indianapolis YMCA Training School) (6th year)

Assistant coach(es)

Legend

- (C) Team captain
- (S) Suspended
- (I) Ineligible
- (W) Walk-on
- Injured
- Current redshirt

Roster

== Schedule ==
Date time, TV	Rank^{#}	Opponent^{#}	Result	Record	Site (attendance) city, state
Non-Conference regular season
12/15/1917*		Millikin	W 40–13	1–0	Kenney Gym (199); Urbana, IL
12/19/1917*		at Millikin University	W 31–13	2–0	Millikin Gymnasium (–); Decatur, IL
1/5/1918*		Wabash College	W 24–9	3–0	Kenney Gym (–); Urbana, IL
Big Ten regular season
1/9/1918		Purdue	W 27–17	4–0 (1–0)	Kenney Gym (635); Urbana, IL
1/14/1918		Minnesota	W 28–17	5–0 (2–0)	Kenney Gym (1,008); Urbana, IL
1/19/1918		Wisconsin	L 21–22	5–1 (2–1)	Kenney Gym (1,108); Urbana, IL
2/2/1918		at University of Chicago	L 19–23	5–2 (2–2)	Bartlett Gymnasium (–); Chicago, IL
2/9/1918		Northwestern; Rivalry	W 38–22	6–2 (3–2)	Kenney Gym (925); Urbana, IL
2/11/1918		Ohio State	W 35–21	7–2 (4–2)	Kenney Gym (673); Urbana, IL
2/16/1918		at Purdue	L 26–29	7–3 (4–3)	Memorial Gymnasium (–); West Lafayette, IN
2/18/1918		at Ohio State	W 26–23	8–3 (5–3)	The Armory (–); Columbus, OH
2/23/1918		at Wisconsin	L 15–23	8–4 (5–4)	University of Wisconsin Armory and Gymnasium (–); Madison, WI
2/25/1918		at Minnesota	L 22–35	8–5 (5–5)	University of Minnesota Armory (–); Minneapolis, MN
3/2/1918		at Northwestern; Rivalry	L 14–29	8–6 (5–6)	Patten Gymnasium (–); Evanston, IL
3/6/1918		University of Chicago	W 20–17	9–6 (6–6)	Kenney Gym (518); Urbana, IL
*Non-conference game. ^{#}Rankings from AP Poll. (#) Tournament seedings in parentheses. All times are in Central Time.

== Player stats ==
Player	Games played	Field goals	Free throws	Points
Earl Anderson	15	67	67	201
Burt Ingwersen	15	24	1	49
Paul Taylor	14	24	0	48
J.S. Probst	10	15	0	30
Benjamin Mittleman	7	13	0	26
Charles Vail	11	8	0	16
J.G. Stevens	7	5	0	10
George Halas	5	1	0	2

== Awards and honors ==
George Halas was enshrined in the Pro Football Hall of Fame (1963), for his role in the development of the National Football League as well as for his coaching and playing for the Chicago Bears.

Earl Anderson was named a Consensus All-American for the 1917–18 season.
