= Joe Schwarzer =

American football player and coach

Biographical details
- Born: September 2, 1895; Bardejov, Austria-Hungary
- Died: September 7, 1989 (aged 94)

Playing career
- 1917–1919: Syracuse
- Position: End

Coaching career (HC unless noted)
- 1920–1924: Syracuse (assistant)
- 1925–1927: NYU (line)
- 1928–1929: Manhattan

Head coaching record
- Overall: 7–8

Accomplishments and honors

Championships
- 1918 Helms Foundation National Basketball Champion

Awards
- 1918 College Football All-America Team; 1918 NCAA Men's Basketball All-American

Joseph Karl Schwarzer (September 2, 1895 – September 7, 1989) was an American football and basketball player and coach. He was an All-American football and basketball player at Syracuse University and spent two seasons as the head football coach at Manhattan College.

== Playing ==
Schwarzer was born in Austria-Hungary and immigrated to the United States when he was four years old. He was a standout athlete at Albany High School and captained the football, basketball, and baseball teams at Syracuse University. He played for the Syracuse basketball team from 1915 to 1918 and was captain of the National Champion 1917–18 Syracuse Orangemen basketball team. Syracuse went 38–7 during Schwarzer's three seasons on the team and he was retroactively named to the 1918 NCAA Men's Basketball All-Americans by the Helms Athletic Foundation. He was also an All-American end for the Syracuse Orangemen football team. He graduated from the Syracuse University College of Law in 1919.

Schwarzer played professional basketball for a number of teams, including the Rochester Centrals and the Syracuse All-Americans.

== Coaching ==
In 1920, Schwarzer became an assistant football coach under Chick Meehan at Syracuse. In 1925, he followed Meehan to NYU. After the 1927 season, the NYU board of athletic control wanted to replace Schwarzer and Meehan announced he would leave if Schwarzer was fired. Schwarzer, however, chose to resign, which led to Meehan returning to NYU. Two months later, Schwarzer became the head coach at Manhattan College. He compiled a 7–8 record from 1928 to 1929. Prior to the 1930 season, the school's graduate manager of athletics announced that Schwarzer would become the team's chief scout and an advisor and Notre Dame captain John B. Law would succeed him as head coach.

== Later life ==
After leaving Manhattan, Schwarzer returned to Central New York to manage his family's real estate business. He was also a college football official for 18 years, retiring in 1956. During World War II, he was a member of Madison County's selective service board and was a superintendent at the U.S. Hoffman Machinery Corporation. From 1957 to 1977, Schwarzer was a member of the Cazenovia, New York board of appeals. He also helped lead an unsuccessful effort to have the Pro Football Hall of Fame built in Cazenovia. He died on September 7, 1989.
