= 1917–18 Michigan Wolverines men's basketball team =

American college basketball season

1917–18 Michigan Wolverines men's basketball
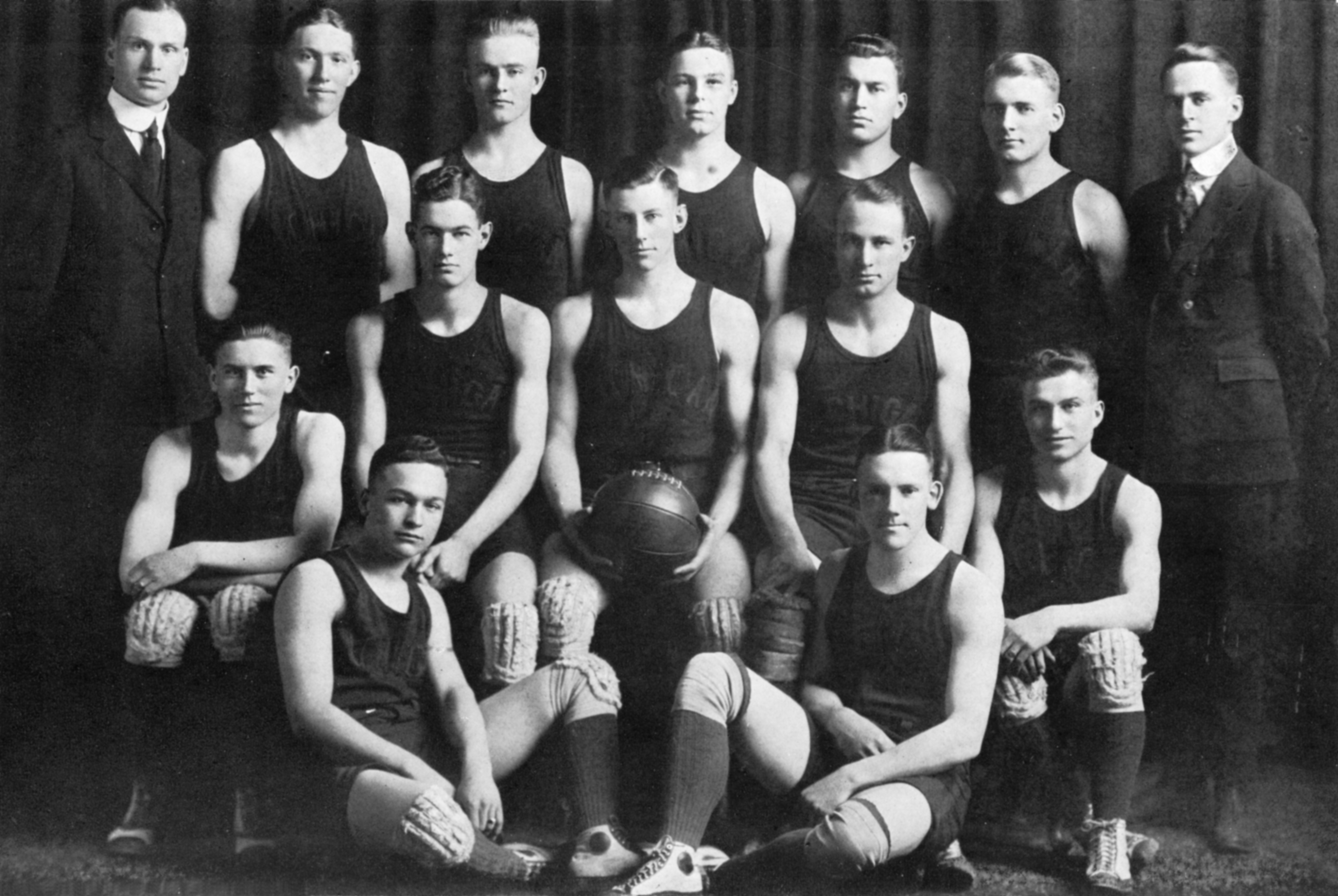
- Conference: Big Ten Conference
- Record: 6–12 (0–10 Big Ten)
- Head coach: Elmer Mitchell
- Captain: Alan W. Boyd
- Home arena: Waterman Gymnasium

1917–18 Big Ten Conference men's basketball standings
| | Conf. | | | | Overall |
| Team | W | | L | PCT | W | | L | PCT |
|---|---|---|---|---|---|---|---|---|
| Wisconsin | 9 | – | 3 | .750 | 14 | – | 3 | .824 |
| Minnesota | 7 | – | 3 | .700 | 13 | – | 3 | .813 |
| Northwestern | 5 | – | 3 | .625 | 7 | – | 4 | .636 |
| Illinois | 6 | – | 6 | .500 | 9 | – | 6 | .600 |
| Chicago | 6 | – | 6 | .500 | 14 | – | 10 | .583 |
| Purdue | 5 | – | 5 | .500 | 11 | – | 5 | .688 |
| Ohio State | 5 | – | 5 | .500 | 12 | – | 7 | .632 |
| Indiana | 3 | – | 3 | .500 | 10 | – | 4 | .714 |
| Iowa | 4 | – | 6 | .400 | 6 | – | 8 | .429 |
| Michigan | 0 | – | 10 | .000 | 6 | – | 12 | .333 |

The 1917–18 Michigan Wolverines men's basketball team represented the University of Michigan in intercollegiate basketball during the 1917–18 season. The team was Michigan's second varsity basketball team and the first after an eight-year hiatus following the 1908–09 season. With no experienced collegiate players to draw from, the squad started from scratch and compiled a record of 6–12. They finished last in the Big Ten Conference with a record of 0–10 against conference opponents, the only winless conference season in Michigan history.

Elmer Mitchell, a 28-year-old graduate of the University of Michigan, served as the coach. He returned to Michigan in 1917 after having held positions as the athletic director at Grand Rapids Union High School from 1912 to 1915 and at Michigan State Normal College (now known as Eastern Michigan University) from 1915 to 1917. After a difficult start in the 1917–18 season, Mitchell led the team to a 12-game turnaround with a 16–8 record in the 1918–19 season. In 1919, Mitchell established the intramural sports program at Michigan and served as its director.

Alan W. Boyd was the team captain. James McClintock was the team's leading scorer with 108 points on 43 field goals and 22 free throws in 16 games. Timothy Hewlett led in scoring average with 7.0 points per game (22 field goals and 12 free throws in eight games).

== Schedule ==
| Date | Opponent | Score | Result | Location |
| December 15, 1917 | Case | 27–25 | Loss | Cleveland, OH |
| January 1, 1918 | Camp Custer | 44–28 | Win | Waterman Gymnasium, Ann Arbor, MI |
| January 4, 1918 | Hope College | 31–15 | Win | Waterman Gymnasium, Ann Arbor, MI |
| January 5, 1918 | Case | 24–20 | Win | Waterman Gymnasium, Ann Arbor, MI |
| January 11, 1918 | Michigan Agricultural College | 17–13 | Win | Waterman Gymnasium, Ann Arbor, MI |
| January 18, 1918 | Indiana | 21–17 | Loss | Waterman Gymnasium, Ann Arbor, MI |
| January 19, 1918 | Chicago | 22–6 | Loss | Bartlett Gymnasium, Chicago, IL |
| January 21, 1918 | Ohio State | 37–7 | Loss | Ohio State Armory, Columbus, OH |
| January 25, 1918 | Minnesota | 28–13 | Loss | Waterman Gymnasium, Ann Arbor, MI |
| January 26, 1918 | Northwestern | 21–11 | Loss | Waterman Gymnasium, Ann Arbor, MI |
| February 11, 1918 | Great Lakes Jackies | 34–27 | Loss | Waterman Gymnasium, Ann Arbor, MI |
| February 13, 1918 | Kalamazoo College | 42–8 | Win | Waterman Gymnasium, Ann Arbor, MI |
| February 16, 1918 | Minnesota | 49–10 | Loss | University of Minnesota Armory, Minneapolis, MN |
| February 22, 1918 | Indiana | 21–20 | Loss | Men's Gymnasium, Bloomington, IN |
| February 23, 1918 | Northwestern | 18–14 | Loss | Patten Gymnasium, Evanston, IL |
| March 1, 1918 | Chicago | 22–15 | Loss | Waterman Gymnasium, Ann Arbor, MI |
| March 2, 1918 | Michigan Agricultural College | 31–25 | Win | Michigan State University Armory, East Lansing, MI |
| March 9, 1918 | Ohio State | 34–27 | Loss | Waterman Gymnasium, Ann Arbor, MI |

== Pre-season ==
In early December 1917, the Detroit Free Press wrote that basketball "receives its inception as a major league sport at Michigan this year." The Free Press noted that the game had never been played "on a big scale" in Ann Arbor, and Coach Mitchell had been unable to find experienced players for the team. As a result, the paper opined that Mitchell "will have his hands full putting any sort of a team on the floor."

Coach Mitchell was also the coach of Michigan's freshman football team and was unable to turn his attention to the basketball team until football season had ended. With his ties to the football team, Mitchell recruited several football players to try out for the basketball team, including Alan Boyd, Abe Cohn, Tad Wieman, Richard Weske, Oscar Cartright, William Cruse, and Angus Goetz. Boyd became the team captain, and Cohn was a reserve on Mitchell's team. During late November and early December, Mitchell held scrimmages to identify the best players. Searching for players with some level of experience, Mitchell looked to the class and fraternity teams. James McClintock, who had played center on the sophomore class team, stood out in the early practices. So, too, did Ralph Rychener who had played forward on the championship team of the fraternity-boarding house league.

In the days leading up to the season opener, Mitchell culled the team to 12 players and put them through strenuous conditioning workouts each night as well as passing and shooting drills.

== Regular season ==
Michigan opened its season on December 15, 1917, with a road game in Cleveland against Case Scientific School. Case had a veteran team that had won the Ohio Conference basketball championship the prior year, and the Wolverines lost the game, 27–25. The Wolverines' performance was hindered by the team's lack of experience, and also by difficulty adjusting to the basketball court in the Case gymnasium, which was much smaller than the court the team had become accustomed to at the Waterman Gymnasium in Ann Arbor. The Wolverines did not play any further games in December.

In late December, the Detroit Free Press noted that three home games set for the first week of January were "expected to arouse interest in the basketball team, a thing which has been noticeable by its absence ever since the practice season started, over a month ago." Coach Mitchell expressed concern that the lack of interest and backing had lowered the spirit of the team.

Over the holidays, the university renovated the basketball court at Waterman Gymnasium. The court was modified to run lengthwise in order to create a larger playing floor, and backboards were hung from the rafters. The Detroit Free Press wrote that the new court "will be one of the largest and best in the state when it is finished."

After a two-week break over the holidays, Michigan won four consecutive home games against the Camp Custer officers' team that featured several former college stars (44–28), Hope College (31–15), Case (24–20), and Michigan Agricultural College (now known as Michigan State University) (17–13), improving its record to 4–1.

After the first three victories, the Detroit Free Press wrote that Michigan's basketball team had begun playing together as a team, had started "passing with a vengeance", and was "improving rapidly in every department of the game and rapidly rounding into a first class organization." At the same time, the paper expressed concern over the team's defense and uncertainty as to how the team would hold up against tougher Big Ten opponents.

Michigan played its first Big Ten Conference basketball game at Waterman Gymnasium on January 18, 1918, against Indiana. The Hoosiers defeated the Wolverines, 21–17. With a respectable showing against Indiana, the Detroit Free Press wrote that the team's followers were confident that "fighting spirit" would carry the team to a good record. The Free Press noted that, although the players had been "shooting and passing wildly", they had made up for their lack of experience with "plenty of fight".

Over the next eight days, Michigan played four more games against Big Ten opponents and lost each game: Chicago (22-6), Ohio State (39-7), Minnesota (28-13), and Northwestern (21-11).

After the January 26 game against the Northwestern, the team had a two-week, mid-season break. Over the break, Coach Mitchell made several changes in his lineup. He announced that, for the remaining games, he would play Rychener and McClintock at forward, Bartz at center, and Emery and Boyd at the guard positions.

The Detroit Free Press opined in early February that a lack of confidence had caused the players to "miss many easy shots, gum up passes, and lose their heads at a critical moment."

After the break, the team lost to the Great Lakes Jackies to extend the team's losing streak to six games. The losing streak, which began against Indiana on January 18, 1918, and continued through the Great Lakes game on February 11, 1918, was a school record that was not broken for 26 years.

The team broke its losing streak with a 42–8 victory over Kalamazoo College on February 13, 1918. Three consecutive losses followed against Minnesota (49–10), Indiana (21–20), and Chicago (22–15). The Wolverines then completed a season sweep of Michigan Agricultural College, winning by a score of 31 to 25 in East Lansing. The Wolverines concluded the season with a 34–27 loss to Ohio State on March 9, 1918.

== Critical assessment of the first season ==
The Michigan Alumnus summarized the season as follows: "Although the standing of the Michigan basketball team in the Conference is not a thing to be proud of, there can be few objections to the basketball team that Mitchell was able to turn out in the first year of the sport here. At the beginning of the season there was only one experienced man, Hanish, on hand, and Hanish left before the end of the first semester. Bartz and Rowley, good players, were also forced out of the game, the latter from injuries and the former from poor scholastic work."

The 1918 Michiganensian wrote:

"Though failing to win a single Conference game, and suffering defeats in 12 of 18 games played, Michigan's first Varsity basketball team did not have such an unsuccessful season as the records would seem to indicate. The Wolverines started the year without an experienced player on hand and Coach Mitchell was not only forced to build a new team -- he was also obligated to get that team into such condition that it could face the best fives in the Big Ten. . . Though more was hoped of the Michigan five, little more could have been expected. The Wolverines were meeting experienced teams in Conference basketball and the Blue players were forced to learn the fundamentals and fine points at the same time. Mitchell worked hard to get a winning combination, but succeeded mostly in preparing his men for next year."

The Detroit Free Press summed up Michigan's first season of varsity basketball with this headline: "Wolverines' Court Year Not in Vain: Much Has Been Accomplished by Coach Mitchell and His Proteges for First Season." The Free Press emphasized that Coach Mitchell began the season without a single experienced player, noted that the team had "gained greatly" in experience and form, and concluded that expectations had been too high among the fans in Ann Arbor:

"At the start of the basketball year there was little hope held out for a Michigan triumph in the indoor game. The campus, not quite understanding the nature of the competition Michigan had to face, hoped for bigger things than lay within the realms of possibility. But, when the situation was once made clear, the students supported the team, despite its losses, and have been quite enthusiastic over its development."

== Post-season awards ==
At the end of the season, six players were awarded varsity "M" letters for their participation on the 1917-18 men's basketball team: Alan W. Boyd, John H. Emery, Timothy Y. Hewlitt, James I. McClintock, Ralph O. Rychener, and Edward E. Ruzicka. Two players were given aMA letters: Nicholas B. Bartz and Samuel C. Bornstein. Three players were given "R" letters as reserves: Cress, Rowley, and Cohn. In early April 1918, the six players who won "M's" met and selected "Doc" Emery to serve as captain of the 1918-19 team.

== Players ==
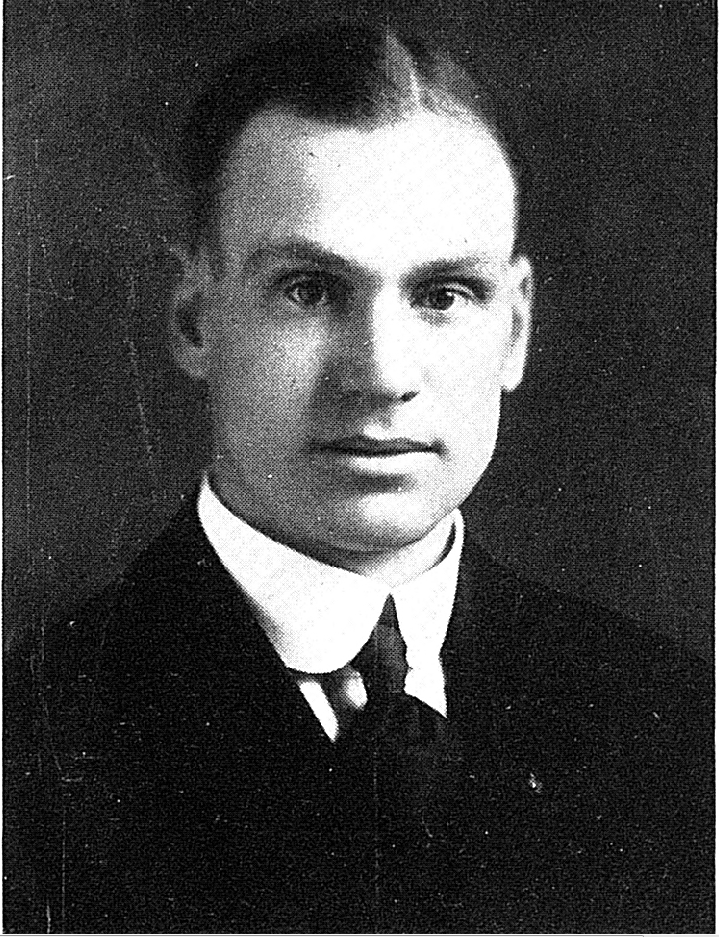
Coach Elmer Mitchell.

- Nicholas B. Bartz - center and aMa letter winner; forced to leave the team before the end of the season due to academic deficiency
- Samuel C. Bornstein - forward and aMa letter winner
- Alan W. Boyd - captain, varsity letter winner and guard
- Abe Cohn - reserve (varsity letter winner in football)
- Elmer W. Cress - reserve
- John H. "Doc" Emery - forward and varsity letter winner
- Hanish - left the team early in the season
- Timothy Y. Hewlett - forward and varsity letter winner
- Curtis C. Latir - center
- James I. McClintock - forward and varsity letter winner
- Howard H. Rowley, Rochester, New York - reserve (medical student, Class of 1920); left the team early due to injury
- Edward Ewan Ruzicka - guard and varsity letter winner
- Ralph O. Rychener - guard and varsity letter winner

== Scoring statistics ==
| Player | Games | Field goals | Free throws | Points | Points per game |
| James McClintock | 16 | 43 | 22 | 108 | 6.8 |
| John Emery | 16 | 29 | 1 | 59 | 3.7 |
| Timothy Y. Hewlett | 8 | 22 | 12 | 56 | 7.0 |
| Edward Ruzicka | 14 | 2 | 29 | 33 | 2.4 |
| Ralph O. Rychener | 14 | 15 | 1 | 31 | 2.2 |
| Nicholas Bartz | 11 | 13 | 0 | 26 | 2.4 |
| Curtis Later | 9 | 8 | 0 | 16 | 1.8 |
| Hanish | 3 | 5 | 0 | 10 | 3.3 |
| Samuel Bornstein | 10 | 3 | 1 | 7 | 0.7 |
| Abe Cohn | 4 | 3 | 0 | 6 | 1.5 |
| Alan Boyd | 13 | 1 | 0 | 2 | 0.2 |
| Total | 16 | 144 | 66 | 354 | 22.1 |

- The scoring statistics do not include the team's December 15, 1917 game against Case Scientific School.

== Coaching staff ==
- Elmer Mitchell - coach
- Gerald F. Nye - manager
- Philip Bartelme - graduate director
