= 1917–18 Syracuse Orangemen basketball team =

American college basketball season

1917–18 Syracuse Orangemen men's basketball
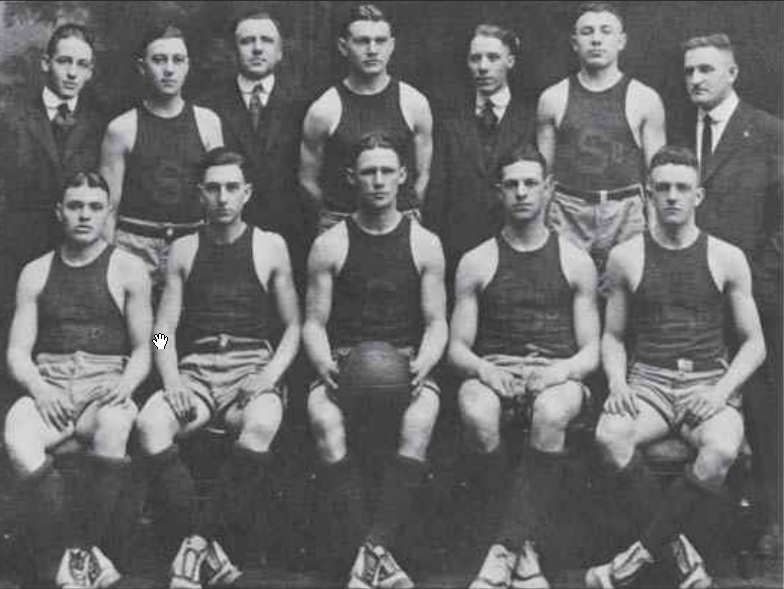

Helms Foundation National Champions
- Conference: Independent
- Record: 16–1
- Head coach: Edmund Dollard (7th season)
- Captain: Joe Schwarzer
- Home arena: Archbold Gymnasium

1917–18 NCAA men's basketball independents standings
	Conf.				Overall
Team	W		L	PCT	W		L	PCT
Canisius		–		–	5	–	0	1.000
Creighton		–		–	14	–	0	1.000
Miami (Ohio)		–		–	10	–	0	1.000
Oregon Agricultural		–		–	15	–	0	1.000
Rhode Island State		–		–	3	–	0	1.000
Saint Mary's (Calif.)		–		–	15	–	0	1.000
Santa Clara		–		–	4	–	0	1.000
Stevens Institute		–		–	14	–	0	1.000
Utah State		–		–	9	–	0	1.000
Wisconsin–Stevens Point		–		–	14	–	0	1.000
Syracuse		–		–	16	–	1	.941
Union (N.Y.)		–		–	14	–	1	.933
Idaho		–		–	12	–	1	.923
Louisiana State		–		–	12	–	1	.923
Penn State		–		–	12	–	1	.923
Oklahoma		–		–	11	–	1	.917
Central (Ky.)		–		–	10	–	1	.909
Navy		–		–	14	–	2	.875
Virginia		–		–	7	–	1	.875
Geneva		–		–	13	–	2	.867
Georgia		–		–	6	–	1	.857
Washington & Jefferson		–		–	10	–	2	.833
Kentucky		–		–	9	–	2	.818
North Carolina State		–		–	13	–	3	.813
Springfield (Mass.)		–		–	13	–	3	.813
California		–		–	8	–	2	.800
Bucknell		–		–	11	–	3	.786
Tempe Normal		–		–	14	–	4	.778
Valparaiso		–		–	7	–	2	.778
Fordham		–		–	10	–	3	.769
Kalamazoo		–		–	10	–	3	.769
Boston		–		–	6	–	2	.750
Buffalo		–		–	6	–	2	.750
Franklin		–		–	9	–	3	.750
North Carolina		–		–	9	–	3	.750
North Central		–		–	9	–	3	.750
Tulane		–		–	6	–	2	.750
Virginia Tech		–		–	15	–	5	.750
Stanford		–		–	11	–	4	.733
Marietta		–		–	8	–	3	.727
Niagara		–		–	8	–	3	.727
Detroit		–		–	13	–	5	.722
St. Joseph's		–		–	5	–	2	.714
CCNY		–		–	7	–	3	.700
New Mexico A&M		–		–	7	–	3	.700
Akron		–		–	9	–	4	.692
Carleton		–		–	9	–	4	.692
Central Missouri		–		–	9	–	4	.692
Lafayette		–		–	15	–	7	.682
Army		–		–	8	–	4	.667
Trinity (N.C.)		–		–	10	–	5	.667
Vanderbilt		–		–	6	–	3	.667
Western State Normal		–		–	8	–	4	.667
Wyoming		–		–	4	–	2	.667
Grinnell		–		–	7	–	4	.636
Roanoke		–		–	7	–	4	.636
Brigham Young		–		–	5	–	3	.625
Rutgers		–		–	5	–	3	.625
Seton Hall		–		–	8	–	5	.615
South Carolina		–		–	8	–	5	.615
Southwestern (Kan.)		–		–	8	–	5	.615
Arizona		–		–	3	–	2	.600
Bowling Green State		–		–	6	–	4	.600
Clemson		–		–	3	–	2	.600
North Dakota Agricultural		–		–	9	–	6	.600
Davidson		–		–	7	–	5	.583
Denison		–		–	7	–	5	.583
Millsaps		–		–	7	–	5	.583
Swarthmore		–		–	7	–	5	.583
Georgetown		–		–	8	–	6	.571
SMU		–		–	5	–	4	.556
Utah		–		–	5	–	4	.556
Lehigh		–		–	11	–	9	.550
Mount Union		–		–	7	–	6	.538
Temple		–		–	8	–	7	.533
Wabash		–		–	8	–	7	.533
Duquesne		–		–	4	–	4	.500
Indiana State		–		–	8	–	8	.500
Montana		–		–	6	–	6	.500
Nevada		–		–	3	–	3	.500
St. John's (N.Y.)		–		–	8	–	8	.500
Texas Christian		–		–	4	–	4	.500
VMI		–		–	6	–	6	.500
Millikin		–		–	10	–	11	.476
DePauw		–		–	7	–	8	.467
Catholic		–		–	5	–	6	.455
Delaware		–		–	5	–	6	.455
Washington and Lee		–		–	5	–	6	.455
Bradley		–		–	6	–	8	.429
Colgate		–		–	9	–	12	.429
Louisville		–		–	3	–	4	.429
Manhattan		–		–	6	–	8	.429
Northern Colorado		–		–	3	–	4	.429
Gettysburg		–		–	5	–	7	.417
Auburn		–		–	2	–	3	.400
Beloit		–		–	4	–	6	.400
Marquette		–		–	4	–	6	.400
Michigan State		–		–	6	–	10	.375
Washington State		–		–	7	–	12	.368
Pittsburgh		–		–	5	–	9	.357
William & Mary		–		–	6	–	11	.353
Dayton		–		–	2	–	4	.333
Notre Dame		–		–	2	–	4	.333
Ohio		–		–	4	–	8	.333
Richmond		–		–	3	–	6	.333
Toledo		–		–	2	–	4	.333
Washington		–		–	4	–	8	.333
Wooster		–		–	4	–	9	.308
Alabama		–		–	2	–	5	.286
Oregon		–		–	3	–	8	.273
Cincinnati		–		–	2	–	6	.250
Montana State		–		–	2	–	6	.250
Tennessee		–		–	3	–	9	.250
Wake Forest		–		–	4	–	12	.250
West Virginia		–		–	4	–	13	.235
Fairmount		–		–	3	–	10	.231
Grove City		–		–	2	–	7	.222
Saint Louis		–		–	3	–	12	.200
Washburn		–		–	2	–	9	.182
Tulsa		–		–	1	–	5	.167
Connecticut		–		–	1	–	6	.143
New York University		–		–	1	–	10	.091
Butler		–		–	0	–	6	.000
The Citadel		–		–	0	–	1	.000
Muhlenberg		–		–	0	–	7	.000
Southern California		–		–	0	–	2	.000

The 1917–18 Syracuse Orangemen basketball team represented Syracuse University in intercollegiate basketball during the 1917–18 season. The team finished the season with a 16–1 record and was retroactively named the national champion by the Helms Athletic Foundation. In addition, the team was retroactively listed as the top team of the season by the Premo-Porretta Power Poll. Joe Schwarzer was retroactively named a 1918 NCAA All-American for his play this season.

== Schedule and results ==
Date time, TV	Rank^{#}	Opponent^{#}	Result	Record	Site city, state
Regular season
12/18/1917*		Alfred	W 36–13	1–0	Archbold Gymnasium; Syracuse, NY
1/4/1918*		Yale	W 34–15	2–0	Archbold Gymnasium; Syracuse, NY
1/11/1918*		at Buffalo	W 30–17	3–0	Rochester, NY
1/12/1918*		at Rochester	W 26–24	4–0	Rochester, NY
1/19/1918*		Princeton	W 27–13	5–0	Archbold Gymnasium; Syracuse, NY
1/25/1918*		at Penn	W 27–24	6–0	Philadelphia, PA
1/26/1918*		at RPI	W 33–18	7–0	Rochester, NY
1/31/1918*		Penn State	W 34–24	8–0	Archbold Gymnasium; Syracuse, NY
2/6/1918*		at Colgate	W 29–25	9–0	Hamilton, NY
2/7/1918*		at Williams	W 19–16	10–0	Williamstown, MA
2/8/1918*		at Yale	W 23–15	11–0	New Haven, CT
2/9/1918*		at NYU	W 30–15	12–0	New York, NY
2/19/1918*		West Virginia	W 21–18	13–0	Archbold Gymnasium; Syracuse, NY
2/22/1918*		NYU	W 37–10	14–0	Archbold Gymnasium; Syracuse, NY
3/1/1918*		Colgate	W 27–18	15–0	Archbold Gymnasium; Syracuse, NY
3/9/1918*		Dartmouth	W 27–11	16–0	Archbold Gymnasium; Syracuse, NY
3/15/1918*		Penn	L 16–17	16–1	Archbold Gymnasium; Syracuse, NY
*Non-conference game. ^{#}Rankings from AP Poll. (#) Tournament seedings in parentheses.
