= Henry Coles (footballer) =

Australian rules footballer

Personal information
- Full name: Henry Coles
- Born: 11 March 1951 (age 75)
- Original team: Kingsbury
- Height: 171 cm (5 ft 7 in)
- Weight: 73 kg (161 lb)
- Position: Midfielder

Playing career^{1}
Years	Club	Games (Goals)
1971–1975	Collingwood	44 (48)
1975–1980	Melbourne	77 (106)
Total		121 (154)

Representative team honours
Years	Team	Games (Goals)
1978	Victoria	1 (0)
- ^{1} Playing statistics correct to the end of 1980.

Henry Coles (born 11 March 1951) is a retired Australian rules footballer, who played for Collingwood and Melbourne in the Victorian Football League (VFL).

== VFL career ==
=== Collingwood ===
Coles was recruited from Kingsbury, a suburb in north-eastern Melbourne. He made his VFL debut, playing as a goalkicking midfielder, in round 1 in 1971, for the Collingwood Football Club. Coles went on to play 44 games for the Magpies, kicking 48 goals in the five seasons he was at the club.

=== Melbourne ===
Coles played five matches for Collingwood during the first half of the 1975 season, but wished to move to the Demons midway through the season. During June he was cleared by Collingwood to play for the Melbourne Football Club, the team Coles played with for the rest of his VFL career. He played his first game for the Demons in round 12 against Footscray.

In 1977 Coles was twice suspended for two matches, for striking John Pitura of Richmond and Lorenzo Serafini of Fitzroy.

Coles played his first and only game for Victoria in 1978, against the ACT. Just nine days later, when Coles was playing his 100th VFL game, against his former club Collingwood, he was reported and in the end suspended for verbally abusing umpire Bill Deller. The 1978 season ended up being the high point of Coles's career, as he finished the season having played 21 matches and kicking 33 goals, thereby winning Melbourne's leading goalkicker award for the season.

Coles' career deteriorated from 1978 onwards, playing only four games in 1979 and seven games in his final season of 1980. His VFL career ended in disgrace when he was fined $600 and suspended for a week after getting into a fight with his captain-coach, Carl Ditterich. He played his last game for Melbourne in round 18 against North Melbourne.
