= Henry Cole (basketball) =

American basketball player and coach

Biographical details
- Education: Trinity (1921)

Playing career

Basketball
- 1918–1920: Trinity
- Position: Forward

Coaching career (HC unless noted)

Basketball
- 1918–1919: Trinity

Head coaching record
- Overall: 6–5

Henry Puryear Cole was an American basketball player and coach. He played for the Trinity Blue and White (now the Duke Blue Devils) from 1918 to 1920, serving as the team's player-coach in the 1918–19 season. Heart trouble led to Cole quitting basketball in 1920.

== Head coaching record ==
Record table
Season	Team	Overall	Conference	Standing	Postseason
Trinity Blue and White (Independent) (1918–1919)
1918–19	Trinity	6–5			
Trinity:		6–5			
Total:		6–5			
National champion Postseason invitational champion Conference regular season champion Conference regular season and conference tournament champion Division regular season champion Division regular season and conference tournament champion Conference tournament champion
