= Rich Falk =

American basketball player and coach

Personal information
- Born: Galva, Illinois
- Listed height: 6 ft 0 in (1.83 m)

Career information
- College: Northwestern (1961–1964)
- NBA draft: 1964: 7th round, 63rd overall pick
- Drafted by: Boston Celtics
- Position: Guard
- Coaching career: 1966–1969, 1972–1986

Career history

Coaching
- 1966–1969; 1972–1978: Northwestern (assistant)
- 1978–1986: Northwestern
- Stats at Basketball Reference

Rich Falk is an American former men's college basketball coach. He was head men's basketball coach at Northwestern University from 1978 to 1986. Falk is the Associate Commissioner of the Big Ten Conference. His primary responsibilities are men's basketball operations, managing the Big Ten men's basketball tournament, and supervising men's basketball officials. Falk joined the Big Ten Conference in 1989 after being a coach and athletic administrator for 20 years.

As a player at Northwestern, he was captain of the 1964 NU team and was chosen Most Valuable Player as a junior and senior. As a senior, Falk set the NU and McGaw Hall single-game scoring record with a 49-point outing against Iowa. Also in that game, Falk set a school record with 19 field goals. He returned to Northwestern in 1966 to serve as an assistant coach for three seasons. Falk left the profession for three years but returned as an assistant in 1972. He was elevated to the position of head coach after the departure of Tex Winter in 1978. While at NU, Falk compiled the second-winningest record in school history. In 1983, he directed Northwestern to the first postseason appearance in school history, winning 18 games and competing in the National Invitation Tournament.

He is also President of REF Enterprises, a sports management and promotion firm specializing in camps, clinics, and special events across the country. He and his son, Geoff, run the Rich Falk Basketball Camp, which is the longest-running basketball camp in the Chicago area.

== Background ==
In high school, Falk was All-State and All-American in both basketball and football (as a quarterback). As a senior, Falk led the state of Illinois in scoring with a 29.8 point per game average. He ranks second in Illinois high school history for the most games scoring more than 50 points (5 games) with his highest single-game total being 57. In 1975, Falk was inducted into the Illinois Basketball Hall of Fame.

Falk received All-Big Ten recognition as a junior and a senior. While at Northwestern he became a member of Delta Tau Delta International Fraternity. He also was a Helms All-American and Academic All-American in 1964. He finished his three-year varsity career with 1,001 points and was drafted by the Boston Celtics in 1964.
