= 1917–18 Wisconsin Badgers men's basketball team =

American college basketball season

1917–18 Wisconsin Badgers men's basketball

Big Ten Conference Champions
- Conference: Big Ten Conference
- Record: 14–3 (9–3 Big Ten)
- Head coach: Guy Lowman
- Home arena: Red Gym

1917–18 Big Ten Conference men's basketball standings
	Conf.				Overall
Team	W		L	PCT	W		L	PCT
Wisconsin	9	–	3	.750	14	–	3	.824
Minnesota	7	–	3	.700	13	–	3	.813
Northwestern	5	–	3	.625	7	–	4	.636
Illinois	6	–	6	.500	9	–	6	.600
Chicago	6	–	6	.500	14	–	10	.583
Purdue	5	–	5	.500	11	–	5	.688
Ohio State	5	–	5	.500	12	–	7	.632
Indiana	3	–	3	.500	10	–	4	.714
Iowa	4	–	6	.400	6	–	8	.429
Michigan	0	–	10	.000	6	–	12	.333

The 1917–18 Wisconsin Badgers men's basketball team represented University of Wisconsin–Madison. The head coach was Guy Lowman, coaching his first season with the Badgers. The team played their home games at the Red Gym in Madison, Wisconsin and was a member of the Big Ten Conference.

== Schedule ==
Date time, TV	Rank^{#}	Opponent^{#}	Result	Record	Site city, state
Regular Season
12/08/1917*		Beloit (WI)	W 26–21	1–0	Red Gym; Madison, WI
12/13/1917*		Ripon (WI)	W 33–13	2–0	Red Gym; Madison, WI
12/15/1917*		North Central (IL)	W 18–13	3–0	Red Gym; Madison, WI
12/19/1917*		Marquette	W 15–14	4–0	Red Gym; Madison, WI
1/02/1918*		at Ripon (WI)	W 35–16	5–0	Ripon, WI
1/05/1918		at Northwestern	L 17–33	5–1 (0–1)	Patten Gymnasium; Evanston, IL
1/08/1918		at Iowa	W 36–22	6–1 (1–1)	Iowa Armory; Iowa City, IA
1/19/1918		at Illinois	W 22–21	7–1 (2–1)	Kenney Gym; Urbana, IL
1/21/1918		Iowa	W 34–19	8–1 (3–1)	Red Gym; Madison, WI
1/26/1918		Purdue	W 21–16	9–1 (4–1)	Red Gym; Madison, WI
2/16/1918		at Chicago	L 21–23	9–2 (4–2)	Bartlett Gymnasium; Chicago, IL
2/23/1918		Illinois	W 23–15	10–2 (5–2)	Red Gym; Madison, WI
3/02/1918		at Minnesota	W 18–17	11–2 (6–2)	Minnesota Armory; Minneapolis, MN
3/07/1918		Northwestern	W 26–18	12–2 (7–2)	Red Gym; Madison, WI
3/09/1918		Chicago	W 16–13	13–2 (8–2)	Red Gym; Madison, WI
3/13/1918		at Purdue	W 24–18	14–2 (9–2)	Memorial Gymnasium; West Lafayette, IN
3/16/1918		Minnesota	L 11–19	14–3 (9–3)	Red Gym; Madison, WI
*Non-conference game. ^{#}Rankings from AP Poll. (#) Tournament seedings in parentheses.
