= Bill Rohr =

Biographical details
- Born: May 21, 1918; Massillon, Ohio, U.S.
- Died: July 16, 1986 (aged 68); Oxford, Ohio, U.S.
- Education: Ohio Wesleyan

Coaching career (HC unless noted)
- 1951–1957: Miami (OH)
- 1957–1963: Northwestern

Administrative career (AD unless noted)
- 1963–1978: Ohio

Head coaching record
- Overall: 157–117
- Tournaments: 0–3 (NCAA)

Accomplishments and honors

Championships
- 4 MAC (1952, 1953, 1955, 1957)

William Rohr (May 21, 1918 – July 16, 1986) was an American college basketball coach and athletics administrator. He was served as the head basketball coach at Miami University from 1951 to 1957 and Northwestern University from 1957 to 1963. He coached his teams to a 157–117 record, winning four Mid-American Conference (MAC) championships at Miami and three NCAA tournament appearances. He also served as Ohio University's athletic director from 1963 to 1978. An alumnus of Ohio Wesleyan University, he was a member of Phi Gamma Delta fraternity.

== Head coaching record ==
Record table
Season	Team	Overall	Conference	Standing	Postseason
Miami Redskins (Mid–American Conference) (1951–1957)
1951–52	Miami (OH)	19–6	9–3	T–1st	
1952–53	Miami (OH)	17–6	10–2	1st	NCAA first round
1953–54	Miami (OH)	12–10	7–5	3rd	
1954–55	Miami (OH)	14–9	11–3	1st	NCAA first round
1955–56	Miami (OH)	12–8	8–4	2nd	
1956–57	Miami (OH)	17–8	11–1	1st	NCAA University Division First Round
Miami (OH):		91–47 (.659)	56–18 (.757)		
Northwestern Wildcats (Big Ten Conference) (1957–1963)
1957–58	Northwestern	13–9	8–6	T–4th	
1958–59	Northwestern	15–7	8–6	T–2nd	
1959–60	Northwestern	11–12	8–6	T–3rd	
1960–61	Northwestern	10–12	6–8	6th	
1961–62	Northwestern	8–15	3–11	T–9th	
1962–63	Northwestern	9–15	6–8	7th	
Northwestern:		66–70 (.485)	39–45 (.464)		
Total:		157–117 (.573)			
National champion Postseason invitational champion Conference regular season champion Conference regular season and conference tournament champion Division regular season champion Division regular season and conference tournament champion Conference tournament champion
