= Dana Evans (athletic director) =

American athlete, coach, and administrator (1874–1924)

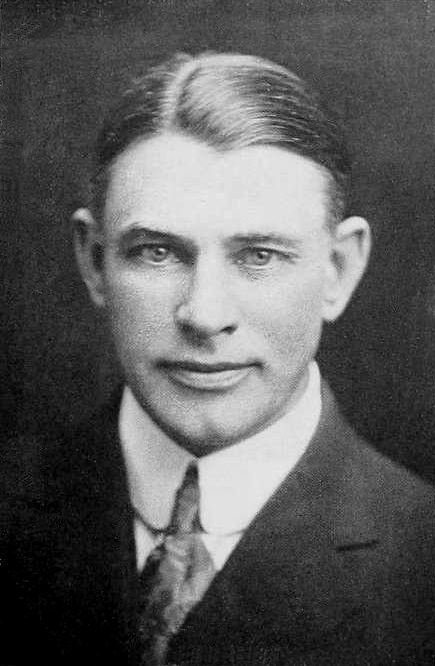
- Evans from The Arbutus, 1918

Biographical details
- Born: May 19, 1874; Massachusetts, U.S.
- Died: November 28, 1924 (aged 50); Evanston, Illinois, U.S.

Playing career

Football
- ?: Boston University

Coaching career (HC unless noted)

Football
- 1910–1914: Beloit
- 1916: Beloit

Basketball
- 1911–1914: Beloit
- 1917–1919: Indiana
- 1921–1922: Northwestern

Baseball
- 1911–1912: Beloit

Administrative career (AD unless noted)
- 1921–1924: Northwestern

Head coaching record
- Overall: 28–13–6 (football); 46–32 (basketball); 10–8 (baseball)

Dana McKean Evans (May 19, 1874 – November 28, 1924), commonly known as "Doc" Evans, was an American athlete, coach and athletics administrator. He played football and baseball at Boston University. For ten years, he directed the Denver Athletic Club's activities. In 1904, he accepted a position as wrestling, basketball and gymnastics coach at Cornell University. He was the athletic director and head basketball coach at Beloit College from 1910 to 1914. He was the head basketball coach at Indiana University (1917–18 through 1918–19 seasons) and Northwestern University (1921–22 season). He compiled a career record of 46–32 in six seasons as a head basketball coach. He was also the head track coach at Indiana. He resigned from his position at Indiana in August 1919 to accept a position as the head of the department of physical education at Northwestern. Evans suffered a nervous breakdown in September 1924 and died of a heart attack in November 1924.
