= Earl William Anderson =

American basketball player (1897–1965)

Personal information
- Born: March 13, 1897 Charleston, Illinois, US
- Died: July 21, 1965 (aged 68) Columbus, Ohio, US

Career information
- High school: Charleston, Illinois, High School
- College: Illinois (1917–1918)
- Position: Forward

Career highlights
- Helms All-American (1918); First-team All-Big Ten

Earl William Anderson (March 13, 1897 – July 21, 1965) was an American college basketball standout for Illinois in the 1910s. A forward, Anderson lead the Fighting Illini in scoring, averaging over 13 points per game during the season. Graduating from Charleston High School, Anderson was the son of prominent Coles County attorney, Albert Carman Anderson and Nellie Wright. Anderson initially took undergraduate coursework at Eastern Illinois State Teachers College, also in Charleston, attending through the '17 spring semester. He transferred to the University of Illinois in order to gain his bachelor's degree in education in 1918. While at Illinois, Anderson was captain of the basketball team.

== Post Illinois ==
After completing his undergraduate studies, Anderson enlisted and was a lieutenant in the navy during World War I, however, based on the fact that the war ended in November 1918, he did not have to see any combat. Upon his return, Anderson married Miss Helen Root, of Charleston and from 1919 to 1924, he took on the role of superintendent of schools for the district he graduated from, Charleston. Anderson continued his education during this time-frame, completing his master's and doctoral degrees from Columbia University in 1926 and 1927 respectively.

Education became a passion for Anderson and in 1926 he took a position as an associate professor at the University of Kansas in their department of education. After one year at Kansas, Anderson moved into an associate professor position at Ohio State, where he would remain for 35 years. During his time at Ohio State, Anderson would advance to become the chair of department of education in 1956, retiring from that post in 1962.
