= Al Horford =

Dominican basketball player (born 1986)

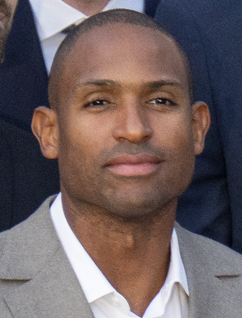
- Horford at the White House in 2024

No. 20 – Golden State Warriors
- Position: Center
- League: NBA

Personal information
- Born: June 3, 1986 (age 40) Puerto Plata, Dominican Republic
- Listed height: 6 ft 8 in (2.03 m)
- Listed weight: 260 lb (118 kg)

Career information
- High school: Grand Ledge (Grand Ledge, Michigan, U.S.)
- College: Florida (2004–2007)
- NBA draft: 2007: 1st round, 3rd overall pick
- Drafted by: Atlanta Hawks
- Playing career: 2007–present

Career history
- 2007–2016: Atlanta Hawks
- 2016–2019: Boston Celtics
- 2019–2020: Philadelphia 76ers
- 2020–2021: Oklahoma City Thunder
- 2021–2025: Boston Celtics
- 2025–present: Golden State Warriors

Career highlights
- NBA champion (2024); 5× NBA All-Star (2010, 2011, 2015, 2016, 2018); All-NBA Third Team (2011); NBA All-Defensive Second Team (2018); NBA All-Rookie First Team (2008); 2× NCAA champion (2006, 2007); Second-team All-American – NABC (2007); Third-team All-American – AP (2007); First-team All-SEC (2007); Second-team All-SEC (2006); SEC tournament MVP (2007)
- Stats at NBA.com
- Stats at Basketball Reference
Medals
Men's basketball
Representing Dominican Republic
FIBA AmeriCup
Bronze medal – third place	2011 Argentina	Team
Centrobasket
Gold medal – first place	2012 Puerto Rico	Team
Bronze medal – third place	2008 Mexico	Team

Alfred Joel Horford Reynoso OMDSM (born June 3, 1986), nicknamed "Big Al", is a Dominican professional basketball player for the Golden State Warriors of the National Basketball Association (NBA). He is a five-time NBA All-Star and an NBA champion.

Horford played college basketball for the Florida Gators and was the starting center on their back-to-back National Collegiate Athletic Association (NCAA) national championship teams in 2006 and 2007. He was drafted with the third overall pick in the 2007 NBA draft by the Atlanta Hawks, with whom he played nine seasons before signing with the Celtics as a free agent in the 2016 offseason.

After three seasons in Boston, Horford played for the Philadelphia 76ers and the Oklahoma City Thunder before being traded back to the Celtics prior to the 2021 season. He reached the NBA Finals with the Celtics in 2022 and 2024, winning his first NBA title in 2024.

== Early life ==
Horford was born in Puerto Plata, Dominican Republic. His father, Tito Horford, played in the National Basketball Association (NBA) for three years and several more in other countries. In 2000, Horford and his family moved to Lansing, Michigan, where he attended Grand Ledge High School in Grand Ledge, Michigan, and was a star on its basketball team. Horford holds seven school records, including most career points (1,239). As a senior, he was named "Class A Player of the Year" after averaging 21 points, 13 rebounds, and five blocks per game. While at Grand Ledge, Horford played AAU basketball for the Michigan Mustangs, who were runners-up in the Adidas Big Time National Tournament. Considered a four-star recruit by Rivals.com, he was listed as the No. 7 power forward and the No. 36 player in the nation in 2004.

== College career ==
Horford accepted an athletic scholarship to attend the University of Florida, choosing the Gators over Michigan, Michigan State, and Ohio State. There, he played for coach Billy Donovan and teamed up alongside Joakim Noah, Corey Brewer and Taurean Green. Horford made an immediate impact for the Gators in 2004–05, starting at center in the front court with David Lee, and helped the Gators win the 2005 Southeastern Conference tournament championship.

The Gators surged through the 2005–06 season, winning the SEC championship for a second straight year. They entered the 2006 NCAA tournament as the No. 3 seed. The Gators swept through the first four rounds to reach the Final Four, then defeated Cinderella team George Mason to reach the championship game, where they defeated UCLA for the school's first national title behind Horford's 14 points and seven rebounds.

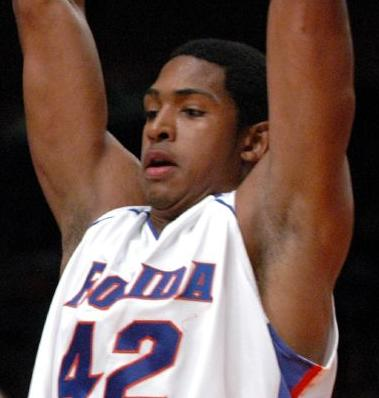
Horford with Florida as a junior

In December 2006, midway through his junior year, Horford missed a series of games due to injury. Coach Donovan held him out of a game against Stetson in hopes that he would be adequately healed for a game in Gainesville against the third-ranked Ohio State Buckeyes on December 23. Though Donovan had previously announced that Horford would be unable to play, Horford entered the game from the bench to guard Ohio State's star freshman Greg Oden, holding him to seven points, well below his season average of 15. Horford recorded 11 points and 11 rebounds in limited action as the Gators defeated the Buckeyes. On March 4, 2007, in the final home game of the season against Kentucky, he became the fourth player on his team to score 1,000 career points, scoring exactly the required 14 points to reach the milestone.

On April 2, 2007, the Gators repeated as national champions, becoming the first team to do so since the 1991–92 Duke Blue Devils, and the first ever to do so with the same starting lineup (Horford, Noah, Brewer, Green, and Lee Humphrey). They defeated Oden and Mike Conley Jr. in a rematch of the regular season, by a score of Gators 84, Buckeyes 75. Three days later, Horford, Noah, Brewer, and Green all declared for the NBA draft.

== Professional career ==
=== Atlanta Hawks (2007–2016) ===
==== All-Rookie honors (2007–2008) ====
On June 28, 2007, Horford was selected by the Atlanta Hawks with the third overall pick in the 2007 NBA draft. On July 9, he signed his rookie scale contract with the Hawks.

As a rookie in 2007–08, Horford was the only player unanimously selected to the NBA All-Rookie First Team; he was also runner-up for Rookie of the Year honors and was named Rookie of the Month on four occasions. Horford became the first Atlanta draftee to earn first team honors since Stacey Augmon in 1991–92. Horford averaged 10.1 points, 9.7 rebounds, 1.5 assists, 0.9 blocks, 0.7 steals and 31.4 minutes in 81 games (77 starts). The Hawks finished the regular season with a 37–45 record and entered the playoffs as the eighth seed in the Eastern Conference. In their first round match-up with the Boston Celtics, Horford helped the Hawks take the eventual champions to seven games, losing the series 4–3. In the series, Horford averaged 12.6 points and 10.4 rebounds per game.

==== Back-to-back All-Star selections (2008–2011) ====
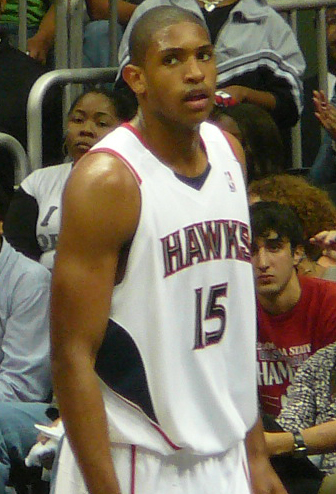
Horford in 2008

In 2008–09, Horford started all 67 games he played, averaging 11.5 points, 9.3 rebounds, 2.4 assists, 1.4 blocks and 0.8 steals in 33.5 minutes. With a 47–35 record, the Hawks entered the playoffs as the fourth seed in the East. Horford helped the Hawks advance to the second round where they were swept by the Cleveland Cavaliers; Horford missed Game 2 of the series due to injury.

Horford had an outstanding season in 2009–10, becoming the first Hawks draft pick to earn an All-Star berth since Kevin Willis did so in 1992. Horford contributed 14.2 points, 9.9 rebounds, 2.3 assists, 1.1 blocks and 0.7 steals in 35.1 minutes (.551 FG%, .789 FT%), appearing in 81 games. He ranked eighth in the NBA in field goal percentage, 10th in rebounds, tied for ninth in offensive rebounds (2.9), and 26th in blocks. Horford had a team-leading 39 double-doubles, which was tied for 11th in the NBA. Playing alongside Mike Bibby, Jamal Crawford, Joe Johnson, Josh Smith and Marvin Williams, the Hawks entered the playoffs as the third seed in the East with a 53–29 record. However, the team again suffered a second-round sweep, this time at the hands of the Orlando Magic.

On November 1, 2010, Horford signed a five-year, $60 million contract extension with the Hawks.

During the 2011 NBA All-Star Weekend, Horford was an All-Star for the second straight year, and he was also a member of the Atlanta team that won the Shooting Stars Competition. In 77 games in 2010–11, Horford posted averages of 15.3 points, 9.3 rebounds, 3.5 assists, 1.0 blocks and 0.8 steals (.557 FG%, .500 3FG%, .798 FT%). He ranked fifth in the NBA in field goal percentage, 28th in blocks and 16th in efficiency (22.5). Horford was also one of the top all-around rebounders in the league, finishing 11th in rebounds, seventh in defensive rebounds (7.0) and tied for 24th in offensive rebounds (2.4). He had 36 double-doubles (tied for ninth in NBA), including one 20/20 game. He was named Third-Team All-NBA. With a 44–38 record, the Hawks entered the playoffs as the fifth seed in the East. They reached the second round again, where they lost 4–2 to the Chicago Bulls.

==== Injury-shortened season (2011–2012) ====
Due to the 2011 NBA lockout, the 2011–12 season did not begin until December 25, 2011. Horford appeared in the Hawks' first 11 games of the season before missing the final 55 due to a torn left pectoral muscle, an injury suffered on January 11, 2012, against the Indiana Pacers. Six days later, he underwent surgery to repair the muscle and was ruled out for three to four months. With a 40–26 record, the Hawks entered the playoffs as the fifth seed in the East. Horford missed an additional three playoff games before returning to action in Game 4 of the Hawks' first round series against the Boston Celtics. He played out the series, which the Hawks lost in six games.

==== Career-best season (2012–2013) ====
In the 2012–13 season, Horford started all 74 games he played, averaging a career-high 17.4 points, career-high 10.2 rebounds, 3.2 assists, 1.1 blocks and career-high 1.1 steals in 37.2 minutes. He recorded 43 double-doubles (20 20-point/10-rebound games), including one in points and assists. Horford scored 20-plus points in nine consecutive games (February 11 – March 3) for the first time in his career. On November 26, 2012, Horford was named Eastern Conference Player of the Week for the first time in his career. On February 27, 2013, Horford scored a career-high 34 points in a 102–91 victory over the Utah Jazz. With a 44–38 record, the Hawks entered the playoffs as the sixth seed in the East. In their first round match-up against the Indiana Pacers, the Hawks were defeated 4–2 despite a playoff career-high 16.7 points per game from Horford over the six games.

==== Second injury-shortened season (2013–2014) ====
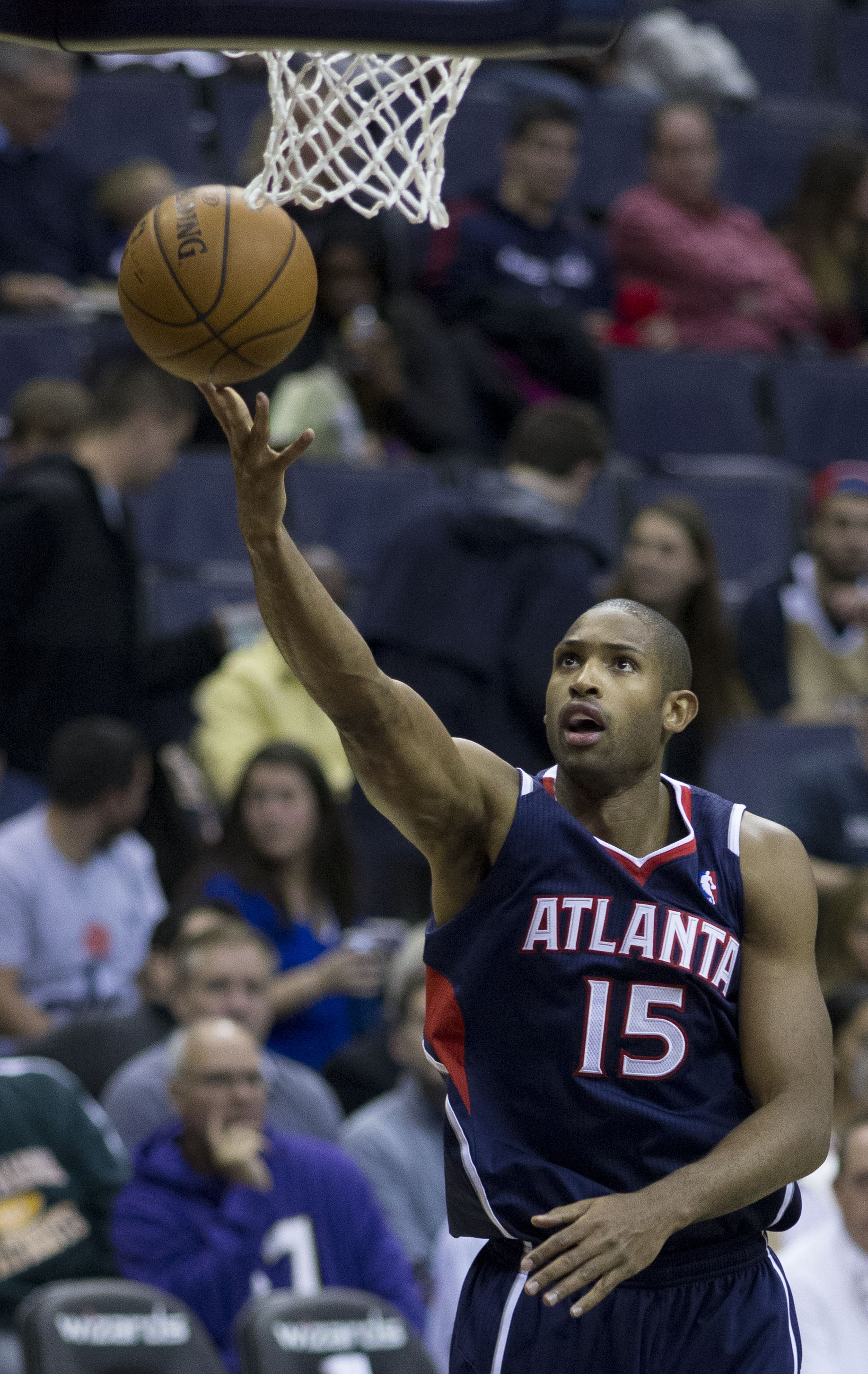
Horford in 2013

Over the first 29 games of the 2013–14 season, Horford posted nine double-doubles and scored in double-figures 28 times, including 13 20-point outings and one 30-point game. Over this stretch, he averaged a career-best 18.6 points per game. However, another shoulder injury suffered on December 26, 2013, sidelined Horford for the rest of the season. Initially considered a "bruised right shoulder", the injury turned out to be a complete tear of his right pectoral muscle, and required season-ending surgery. Horford did not play in the postseason, where the Hawks lost in the first round to the Indiana Pacers.

==== Return to All-Star form (2014–2016) ====
In 2014–15, Horford played in 76 regular season games, the most since the 2010–11 season. On December 22, 2014, he was named Eastern Conference Player of the Week for games played from Monday, December 15 to Sunday, December 21. Horford earned the award for just the second time in his career. On January 13, 2015, Horford recorded his first career triple-double with 21 points, 10 rebounds and 10 assists in a 105–87 victory over the Philadelphia 76ers. Six days later, Horford was named Eastern Conference Player of the Week for games played from Monday, January 12 to Sunday, January 18. On January 29, he earned his third All-Star nod as a reserve for the Eastern Conference in the 2015 NBA All-Star Game. In a brilliant stretch of play from December 7 to January 31, Horford scored in double digits in 28 consecutive games. Between December and January, the Hawks went 28–2 and had a franchise-best 19 game winning streak. Behind Horford and fellow All-Star teammates Paul Millsap, Kyle Korver, and Jeff Teague, the Hawks finished the regular season with the best record in the Eastern Conference at 60–22, and advanced through to the Eastern Conference Finals for the first time since the 1960s, when the franchise was located in St. Louis. There, they were defeated by the Cleveland Cavaliers in a four-game sweep.

In the 2015–16 season, Horford played in all 82 regular season games for the first time in his career. On November 11, 2015, Horford scored 26 points and made a career-high four three-pointers in a 106–98 victory over the New Orleans Pelicans. On December 4, Horford scored 16 points against the Los Angeles Lakers to extend his streak of double-digit games to 22, setting a career high. Horford's streak came to an end at 23 after scoring nine points against the Oklahoma City Thunder in the Hawks' 24th game of the season on December 10. On February 12, 2016, Horford was named to replace the injured Chris Bosh on the 2016 Eastern Conference All-Star team, thus marking his fourth All-Star selection. On February 28, Horford recorded his 200th career double-double with 13 points and 16 rebounds in an 87–76 victory over the Charlotte Hornets. With a 48–34 record, the Hawks entered the playoffs as the fourth seed in the East. They reached the second round where they were swept by the Cavaliers for the second straight year.

=== Boston Celtics (2016–2019) ===
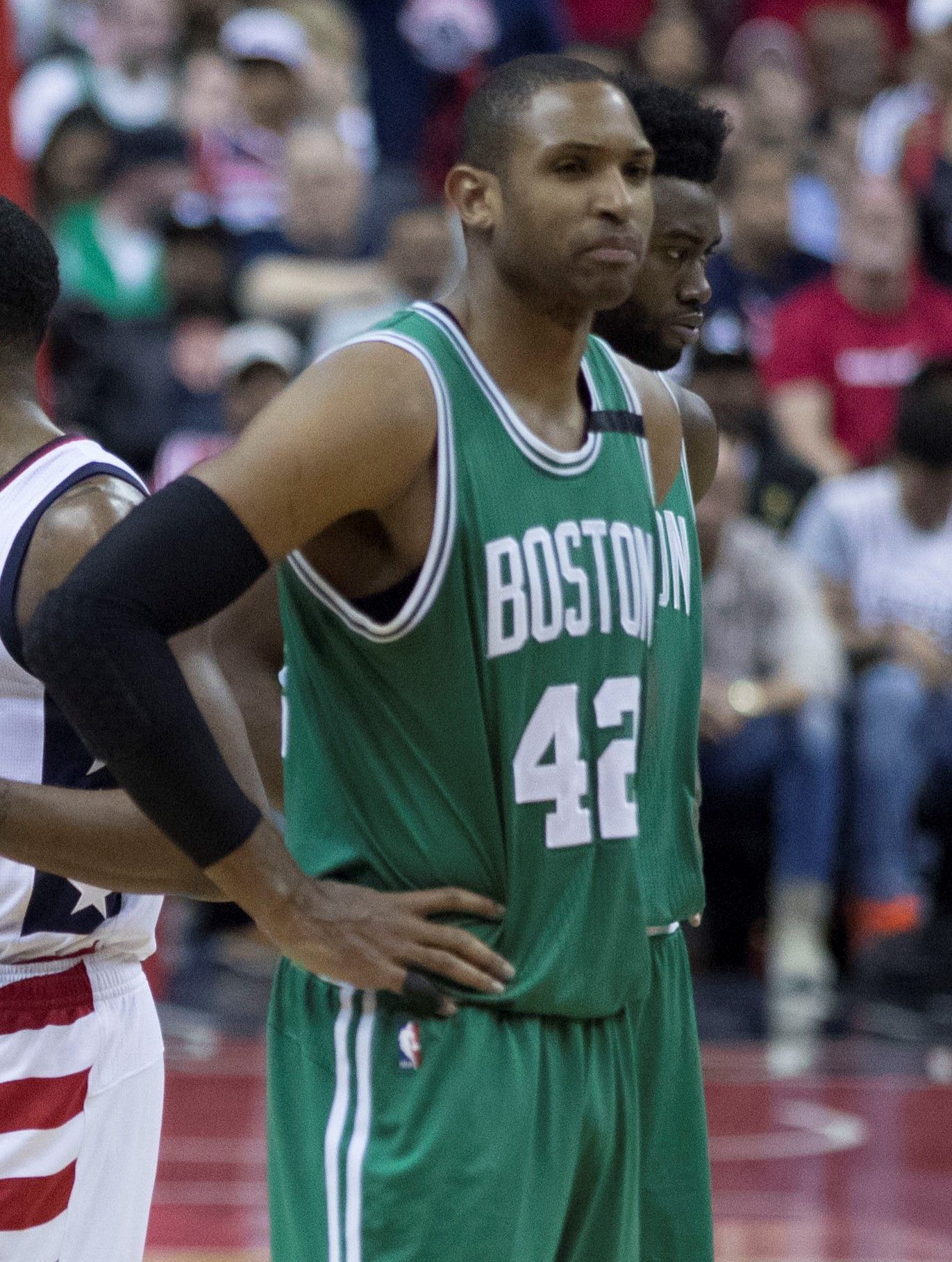
Horford in 2017

On July 8, 2016, Horford signed a four-year, $113 million contract with the Boston Celtics and said that he was looking forward to working with Celtics head coach Brad Stevens and the rest of the team to bring a championship trophy back to Boston. Horford made his Celtics debut in their season-opening 122–117 victory over the Brooklyn Nets on October 26, 2016, recording 11 points, five rebounds, and six assists. Horford appeared in the team's first three games of the season, but then missed nine straight games with a concussion. He returned to action on November 19 and had 18 points, 11 rebounds, and five assists in a narrow 94–92 road victory over the Detroit Pistons. On March 19, 2017, Horford scored a season-high 27 points in a 105–99 loss to the Philadelphia 76ers. In Game 1 of the Celtics' second-round playoff series against the Washington Wizards, Horford nearly had a triple-double with 21 points, 10 rebounds, and nine assists during a 123–111 victory. The Celtics went on to reach the Eastern Conference Finals, where they lost to the Cleveland Cavaliers in five games.

On November 12, 2017, Horford returned from a two-game absence with a concussion and scored 21 points on 8-of-9 shooting to help the Celtics hang on to narrowly beat the Toronto Raptors 95–94 for their 12th straight victory. On December 2, he had 14 points, five rebounds, and a career-best 11 assists in a 116–111 victory over the Phoenix Suns. Two days later, Horford recorded 20 points, nine rebounds, and eight assists in a 111–100 victory over the Milwaukee Bucks. On February 4, 2018, he made a 15-foot fadeaway jumper at the buzzer to lift the Celtics to a narrow 97–96 victory over the Portland Trail Blazers, finishing with 22 points, 10 rebounds, and five assists. Horford made his fifth All-Star team when he was nominated as a reserve for the 2018 NBA All-Star Game. In Game 1 of the Celtics' first-round playoff series against the Bucks, Horford had 24 points and 12 rebounds during a 113–107 overtime victory. In Game 7, he had 26 points, eight rebounds, and three assists during a 112–96 victory. The Celtics went on to reach the Eastern Conference Finals, where they lost in seven games to the Cavaliers.

On October 19, 2018, Horford had 14 points, 10 rebounds, and nine assists in a 113–101 loss to the Raptors. In December, he missed seven games with a sore left knee. On December 29, Horford scored 18 points with a career high-tying five three-pointers to go along with five rebounds and three assists in a 112–103 road victory over the Memphis Grizzlies. On February 21, 2019, he recorded 21 points, five assists, and a season-high 17 rebounds in a narrow 98–97 loss to the Bucks. On April 1, Horford recorded his second career triple-double with 19 points, 11 rebounds, and 10 assists in a 110–105 victory over the Miami Heat.

=== Philadelphia 76ers (2019–2020) ===
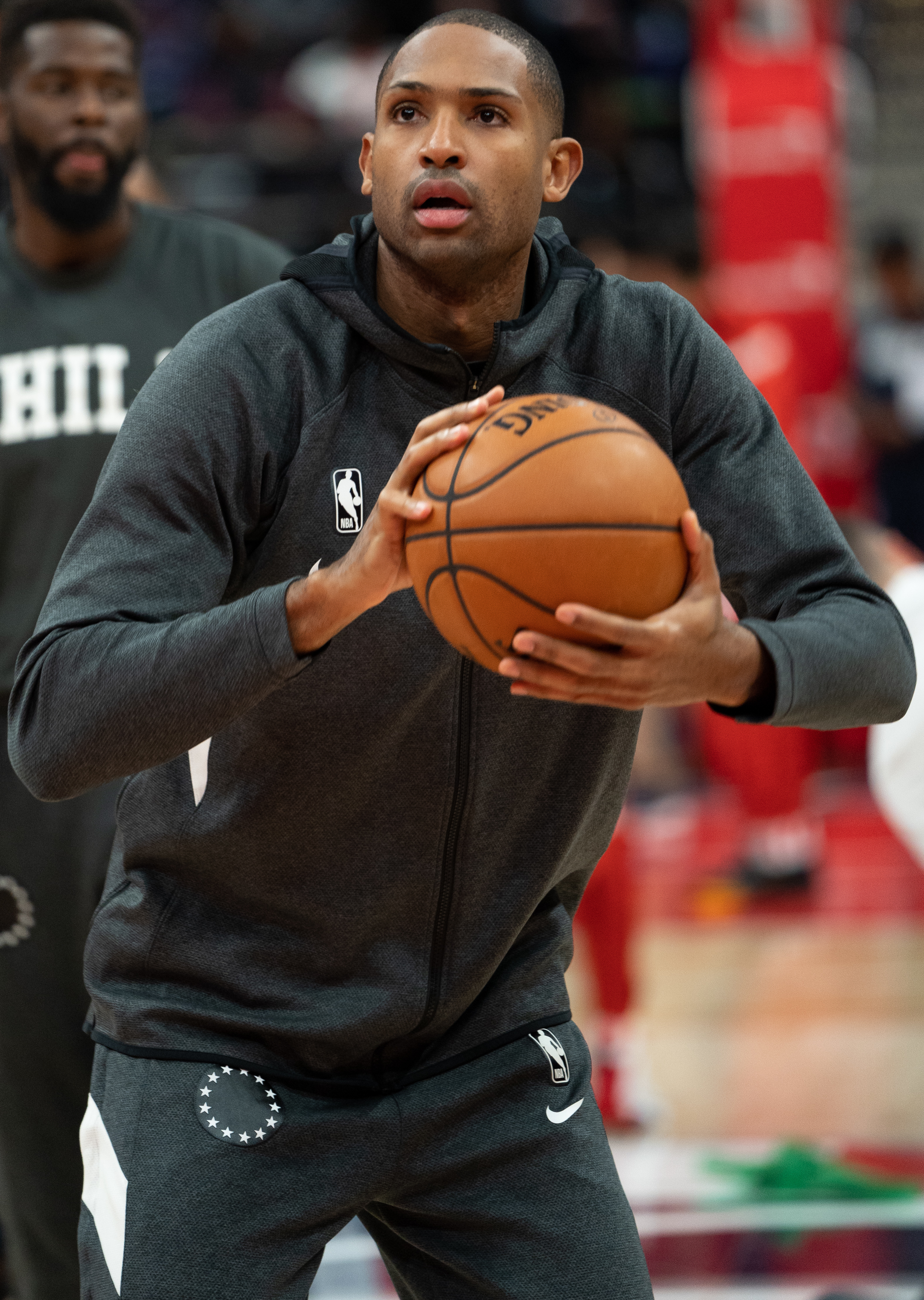
Horford in 2019

On July 10, 2019, Horford signed with the Philadelphia 76ers. An unrestricted free agent, he signed a four-year, $97 million (with $12 million in bonuses) contract.

On October 23, 2019, Horford made his 76ers debut, recording 16 points, two rebounds, and three assists in a 107–93 victory over his former team, the Boston Celtics. On November 4, Horford scored a season-high 32 points, alongside five rebounds, four assists, and two steals in a 114–109 loss to the Phoenix Suns. The 76ers faced the Celtics during their first-round playoff series, but they were eliminated in a four-game sweep, with Horford only averaging 7.0 points per game.

=== Oklahoma City Thunder (2020–2021) ===
On December 8, 2020, Horford was traded, alongside a 2025 first-round pick and the draft rights to Théo Maledon and Vasilije Micić, to the Oklahoma City Thunder in exchange for Terrance Ferguson, Danny Green and Vincent Poirier. Horford's arrival came three months after his former college coach, Billy Donovan, left the Thunder.

Horford made his Thunder debut on December 26, 2020, recording three points, three assists, and a season-high 13 rebounds in a narrow 109–107 victory over the Charlotte Hornets. On February 5, 2021, Horford scored a season-high 26 points, alongside seven rebounds, eight assists, two steals, and three blocks in a 106–103 loss to the Minnesota Timberwolves. On March 27, the Thunder announced that Horford would sit out the rest of the season as the team prioritized developing its younger players.

=== Return to Boston (2021–2025) ===
==== First NBA Finals (2021–2022) ====
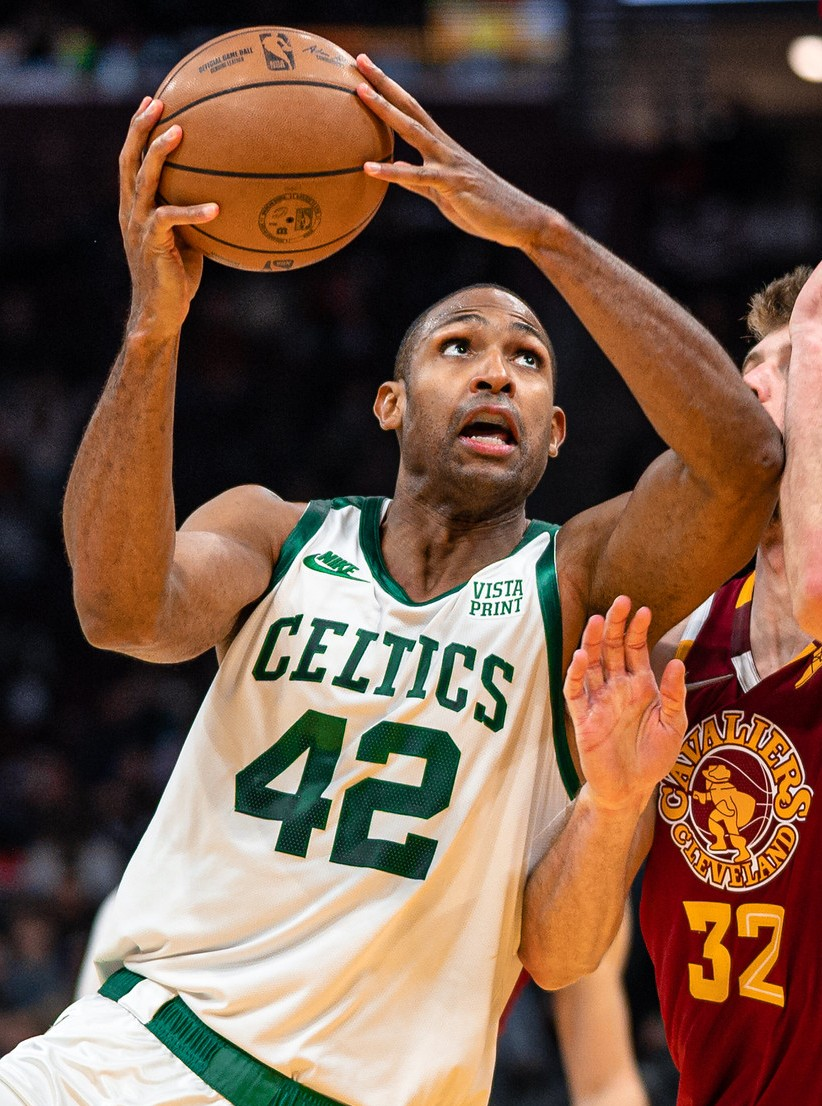
Horford in 2021

On June 18, 2021, Horford was traded, alongside Moses Brown and a 2023 second-round pick, to the Boston Celtics in exchange for Kemba Walker, the 16th overall pick in the 2021 NBA draft, and a 2025 second-round pick. On March 3, 2022, Horford helped the Celtics to a 120–107 victory over the Memphis Grizzlies with a season-high 21 points and 15 rebounds.

On May 7, 2022, in Game 3 of the Eastern Conference Semifinals, Horford scored 22 points to go along with 16 rebounds, five assists, two blocks, and no turnovers in a 103–101 loss against the reigning champion Milwaukee Bucks. Two days later in Game 4, he recorded a playoff career-high 30 points, along with eight rebounds on 11-of-14 shooting from the field and had a playoff career-high 5-of-7 shooting from three-point range in a 116–108 victory to tie the series at 2–2.

On May 29, 2022, Horford had five points and 14 rebounds as he reached the NBA Finals for the first time in his 15-year career when the Celtics defeated the Miami Heat by a score of 100–96 in Game 7 of the Eastern Conference Finals. Before doing so, Horford set a record for the most playoff games without an NBA Finals appearance, with 141. He also became the first Dominican to reach the NBA Finals. In Game 1 of the Finals four days later, Horford led the Celtics to a 120–108 comeback victory over the Golden State Warriors with 26 points and six rebounds. He hit six three-pointers during the game, setting an NBA record for most threes made by a player in his Finals debut. The Celtics took a 2–1 series lead, but eventually lost in six games despite Horford's 19-point, 14-rebound outing during the 103–90 close-out loss in Game 6 on June 16.

==== Contract extension (2022–2023) ====
On December 1, 2022, Horford signed a two-year, $20 million extension with the Celtics. On January 19, 2023, he had 20 points, 10 rebounds, and three blocks in a rematch of the previous Finals as he helped the Celtics beat the Golden State Warriors in overtime 121–118. On March 2 against the Cleveland Cavaliers, Horford recorded 23 points, 11 rebounds, and three assists as the Celtics won 117–113.

==== First NBA Championship (2023–2024) ====
With the arrival of offseason trade acquisition Kristaps Porziņģis, Horford would assume the role of a reserve, after having started nearly every game up to that point. On April 29, 2024, in Game 4 of the first round of the playoffs against the Miami Heat, Porziņģis was injured, putting Horford in line to be the Celtics' starting center. On May 15, in Game 5 of the Eastern Conference Semifinals against the Cleveland Cavaliers, he recorded 22 points, 15 rebounds, five assists, and three steals in the close-out 113–98 victory, becoming the first player in NBA history to record 10+ rebounds, 5+ three-pointers, 5+ assists, and 3+ blocks. Ten days later, in Game 3 of the Eastern Conference Finals against the Indiana Pacers, Horford scored 23 points on a career-high seven three-pointers in a 114–111 comeback victory. The Celtics swept the Pacers in four games and advanced to the 2024 NBA Finals, where he started in all five games as they defeated the Dallas Mavericks, giving Horford his first NBA championship in his 186th career playoff game, the record for most playoff games before a championship. This made Horford the first Dominican player to win an NBA championship.

=== Golden State Warriors (2025–present) ===
On October 1, 2025, Horford signed a two-year, $12 million contract with the Golden State Warriors. Horford made 45 appearances (including 13 starts) for Golden State during the 2025–26 NBA season, averaging 8.3 points, 4.9 rebounds, and 2.6 assists.

On June 25, 2026, Horford opted out of his contract and re-signed with the Warriors on a two-year, $14 million contract.

== National team career ==
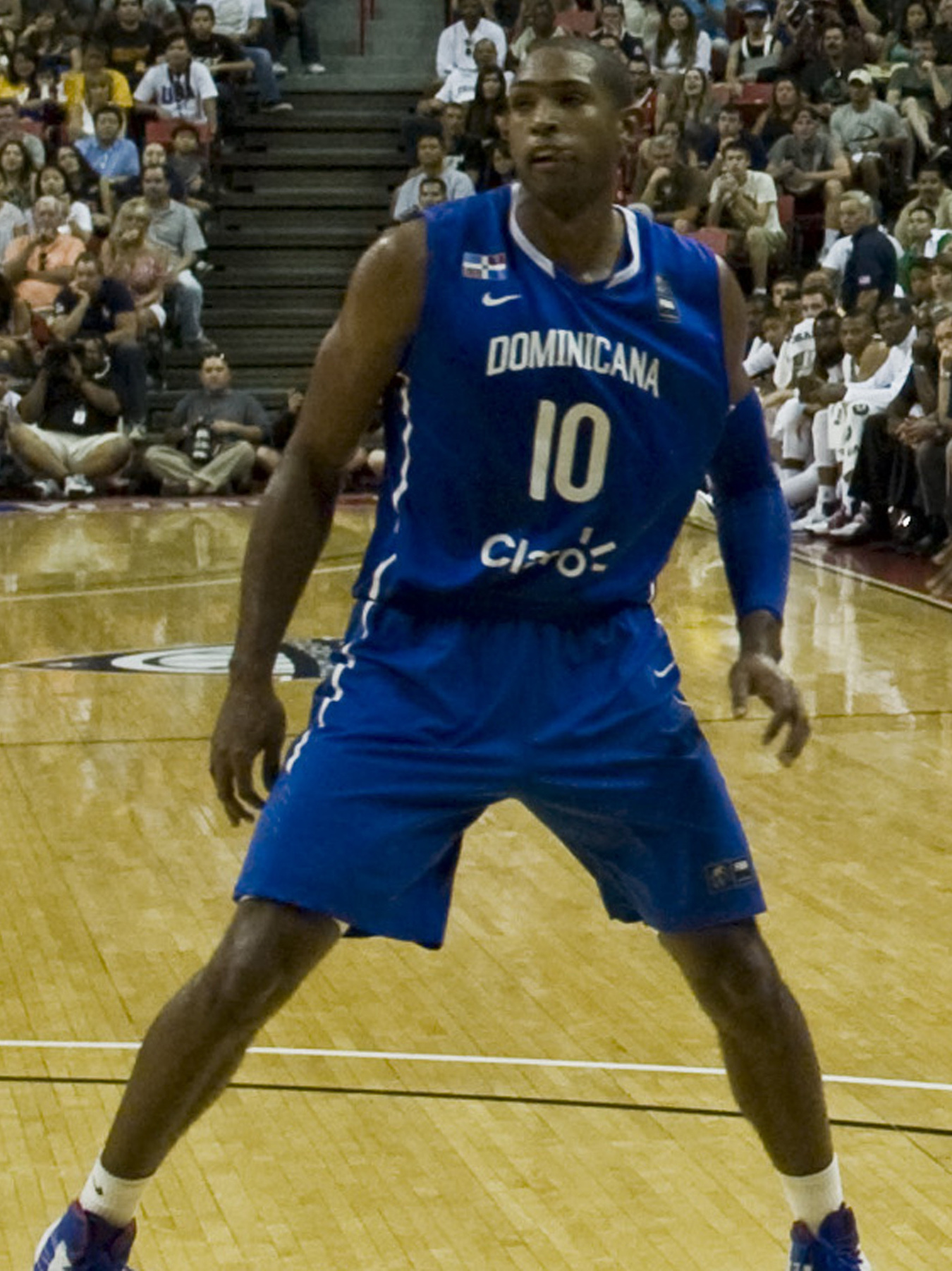
Horford representing the Dominican Republic during an exhibition in 2012

Horford was a member of the Dominican Republic national team from 2008 to 2012. In 2011, he won a bronze medal at the FIBA Americas Championship and earned All-Tournament Team honors.

Horford was selected for the country's 30-man extended list ahead of the 2023 FIBA Basketball World Cup.

== Career statistics ==
Legend
GP	Games played	GS	Games started	MPG	Minutes per game
FG%	Field goal percentage	3P%	3-point field goal percentage	FT%	Free throw percentage
RPG	Rebounds per game	APG	Assists per game	SPG	Steals per game
BPG	Blocks per game	PPG	Points per game	**Bold**	Career high
†	Won an NBA championship	*	Led the league

=== NBA ===
==== Regular season ====
Year	Team	GP	GS	MPG	FG%	3P%	FT%	RPG	APG	SPG	BPG	PPG
2007–08	Atlanta	81	77	31.4	.499	.000	.731	9.7	1.5	.7	.9	10.1
2008–09	Atlanta	67	67	33.5	.525	.000	.727	9.3	2.4	.8	1.4	11.5
2009–10	Atlanta	81	81	35.1	.551	**1.000**	.789	9.9	2.3	.7	1.1	14.2
2010–11	Atlanta	77	77	35.1	.557	.500	.798	9.3	3.5	.8	1.0	15.3
2011–12	Atlanta	11	11	31.6	.553	.000	.733	7.0	2.2	.9	1.3	12.4
2012–13	Atlanta	74	74	**37.2**	.543	.500	.644	**10.2**	3.2	**1.1**	1.1	17.5
2013–14	Atlanta	29	29	33.0	**.567**	.364	.682	8.4	2.6	.9	**1.5**	**18.6**
2014–15	Atlanta	76	76	30.5	.538	.306	.759	7.2	3.2	.9	1.3	15.2
2015–16	Atlanta	**82***	**82***	32.1	.505	.344	.798	7.3	3.2	.8	**1.5**	15.2
2016–17	Boston	68	68	32.3	.473	.355	.800	6.8	**5.0**	.8	1.3	14.0
2017–18	Boston	72	72	31.6	.489	.429	.783	7.4	4.7	.6	1.1	12.9
2018–19	Boston	68	68	29.0	.535	.360	.821	6.7	4.2	.9	1.3	13.6
2019–20	Philadelphia	67	61	30.2	.450	.350	.763	6.8	4.0	.8	.9	11.9
2020–21	Oklahoma City	28	28	27.9	.450	.368	.818	6.7	3.4	.9	.9	14.2
2021–22	Boston	69	69	29.1	.467	.336	.842	7.7	3.4	.7	1.3	10.2
2022–23	Boston	63	63	30.5	.476	.446	.714	6.2	3.0	.5	1.0	9.8
2023–24†	Boston	65	33	26.8	.511	.419	.867	6.4	2.6	.6	1.0	8.6
2024–25	Boston	60	42	27.6	.423	.363	**.895**	6.2	2.1	.6	.9	9.0
2025–26	Golden State	45	13	21.5	.426	.361	.846	4.9	2.6	.7	1.1	8.3
Career		1,183	1,091	31.2	.507	.376	.764	7.7	3.2	.8	1.1	12.7
All-Star		5	0	12.0	.667	.200	1.000	4.4	1.6	.4	.4	6.2

==== Playoffs ====
Year	Team	GP	GS	MPG	FG%	3P%	FT%	RPG	APG	SPG	BPG	PPG
2008	Atlanta	7	7	**39.5**	.472	—	.741	**10.4**	3.6	.4	1.0	12.6
2009	Atlanta	9	9	28.0	.424	.000	.667	5.8	2.0	.7	.7	6.9
2010	Atlanta	11	11	35.3	.523	**1.000**	.839	9.0	1.8	.7	1.7	14.6
2011	Atlanta	12	12	39.0	.423	.000	.769	9.6	3.5	.4	1.0	11.3
2012	Atlanta	3	2	35.9	**.588**	—	.750	8.3	2.7	**1.3**	1.3	15.3
2013	Atlanta	6	6	36.3	.494	—	.667	8.8	3.0	1.0	.8	**16.7**
2015	Atlanta	16	16	32.6	.507	.222	.750	8.6	3.7	.8	1.4	14.4
2016	Atlanta	10	10	32.7	.466	.393	**.938**	6.5	3.0	1.2	**2.4**	13.4
2017	Boston	18	18	33.9	.584	.519	.759	6.6	**5.4**	.8	.8	15.1
2018	Boston	19	19	35.7	.544	.349	.827	8.3	3.3	1.0	1.2	15.7
2019	Boston	9	9	34.5	.418	.409	.833	9.0	4.4	.4	.8	13.9
2020	Philadelphia	4	3	32.1	.480	.000	.571	7.3	2.3	.3	1.3	7.0
2022	Boston	**23**	**23**	35.4	.523	.480	.778	9.3	3.3	.8	1.3	12.0
2023	Boston	20	20	30.8	.386	.298	.750	7.2	3.0	1.1	1.7	6.7
2024†	Boston	19	15	30.3	.478	.368	.636	7.0	2.1	.8	.8	9.2
2025	Boston	11	9	31.6	.472	.400	.857	6.0	1.8	.6	1.3	8.0
Career		197	189	33.7	.493	.391	.775	7.9	3.2	.8	1.2	11.9

=== College ===
Year	Team	GP	GS	MPG	FG%	3P%	FT%	RPG	APG	SPG	BPG	PPG
2004–05	Florida	32	25	22.8	.480	—	.582	6.5	.9	.8	1.6	5.6
2005–06	Florida	**39**	**39**	25.9	**.608**	.000	.611	7.6	2.0	**1.0**	1.7	11.3
2006–07	Florida	38	36	**27.8**	**.608**	.000	**.644**	**9.5**	**2.2**	.7	**1.8**	**13.2**
Career		109	100	25.7	.586	.000	.619	7.9	1.7	.9	1.7	10.3

== Personal life ==
Horford's father, Tito Horford, also played basketball. Tito, whose father was a Bahamian immigrant, was recruited by Marian Christian High School in Houston and attended Louisiana State and Miami before being drafted in the second round of the 1988 NBA draft. Tito played three years in the NBA and several more overseas. His uncle, Kelly Horford, played at Florida Atlantic University in the early 1990s, while his brother, Jon Horford, played at Michigan and Florida. Horford also has two sisters and three younger brothers.

Horford is married to 2003 Miss Universe Amelia Vega. The couple are both from the Dominican Republic but met in Boston, Massachusetts at the Latin Pride Awards in 2007. Horford and Vega got married on Christmas Eve in 2011, right after the NBA lockout. David Ortiz lent the couple his Rolls-Royce Phantom for the wedding since there were no limos available. The couple have five children together.

On September 12, 2024, Horford visited the Dominican Republic with the Larry O'Brien Trophy, the first of his countrymen to be able to do so. For his contributions to Dominican basketball as well as the significance of his NBA championship win, Horford subsequently was awarded the Order of Merit of Duarte, Sánchez and Mella, the highest civilian and military honor in the Dominican Republic.

Also in September, Horford was inducted into the Grand Ledge High School Athletics Hall of Fame. He was represented by his father, Tito, at the halftime of a Grand Ledge varsity football game against rival Holt. On February 21, 2025, Horford's #42 was retired at Grand Ledge High School. He became only the second member of the Grand Ledge High School Athletics Hall of Fame to also have their number retired (other is the school's legendary baseball and football coach Pat O’Keefe).

Horford wears number 42 in honor of Jackie Robinson.

Horford is a member of the Church of God Ministry of Jesus Christ International.

== See also ==
- List of Afro-Latinos
- List of NBA career blocks leaders
- List of NBA career playoff rebounding leaders
- List of NBA career playoff blocks leaders
- List of NBA career playoff games played leaders
- List of NBA career playoff minutes leaders
- List of second-generation NBA players
- Dominican-Americans in Boston
