= 2007 NCAA Division I men's basketball championship game =

American college basketball final

2007 NCAA Tournament Championship Game
National championship game
Ohio State Buckeyes	Florida Gators
Big Ten	SEC
(35–3)	(34–5)
75	84
Head coach: Thad Matta	Head coach: Billy Donovan
- AP: 1
- Coaches: 1
- AP: 3
- Coaches: 3
	1st half	2nd half	Total
Ohio State Buckeyes	29	46	75
Florida Gators	40	44	84
- Date: April 2, 2007
- Venue: Georgia Dome, Atlanta, Georgia
- MVP: Corey Brewer, Florida
- Favorite: Florida by 3
- Referees: Karl Hess, Tony Greene, Edward Corbett
- Attendance: 51,458

United States TV coverage
- Network: CBS
- Announcers: Jim Nantz (play-by-play); Billy Packer (color); Sam Ryan (sideline)
- Nielsen Ratings: 12.2

The 2007 NCAA Division I men's basketball championship game was the finals of the 2007 NCAA Division I men's basketball tournament and determined the national champion for the 2006–07 NCAA Division I men's basketball season. The game was played at the Georgia Dome in Atlanta, Georgia, between the South Regional Champion and top-ranked Ohio State Buckeyes and the Midwest Regional Champion and defending national champion, the overall No. 1 seed Florida Gators. Florida won 84–75, to successfully defend their national championship, becoming the seventh school to repeat as national champions, and were the last to accomplish such a feat until Connecticut in 2024.

For the second time in three years, the national title game was played between two No. 1 seeds. This game was a rematch of the game at O'Connell Center on December 23, 2006, which was won by Florida who defeated Ohio State in an 86–60 victory. This game featured the same two teams that participated in the 2007 BCS National Championship Game marking the first time (and only current in Tournament history) that the same two schools were competing for the football and basketball national championships which saw Florida beat Ohio State 41–14 to be the national champions of college football.

This was Florida's last national championship until 2025, when they defeated Houston, 65–63.

== Participants ==
=== Ohio State Buckeyes ===
Ohio State entered the South region of the tournament as the No. 1 seed. In the first round, Greg Oden had a double-double to beat Central Connecticut State 78–57. In the second round, Ohio State overcame a late deficit for a 78–71 overtime win over Xavier. In the Sweet 16, Oden blocked a last second shot by Ramar Smith to beat Tennessee 85–84. In the Elite Eight, Ohio State used Oden's 17 points to beat Memphis 92–76 for a trip to the Final Four. In the Final Four, Oden's 13 points were six points short of Roy Hibbert's 19 points but it was Ohio State who got the victory beating Georgetown 67–60 for a trip to the National Championship Game for the first time since 1962.

=== Florida Gators ===
Defending champion Florida entered the tournament as the overall No. 1 seed. In the first round, Florida played a dominant second half against Jackson State outscoring them 71–34 in the 2nd half to take a 112–69 win. In the second round, Florida beat Purdue 74–67 to stay alive in their quest for a 2nd straight national title. In the Sweet 16, Florida took another step closer to becoming the first team to win back-to-back championships since the 1991–92 Duke Blue Devils with a 65–57 win over Butler. In the Elite Eight, Florida beat Oregon 85–77 to advance to the Final Four. In the national semi-final, Florida beat UCLA 76–66 to advance to the championship game.

== Starting lineups ==
Ohio State	Position	Florida
Jamar Butler	G	Taurean Green
Mike Conley Jr.	G	Lee Humphrey
Ron Lewis	G/F	Corey Brewer
Ivan Harris	F	Joakim Noah
Greg Oden	C	Al Horford

== Game summary ==
CBS

April 2, 2007
9:21 PM ET

Recap

#MW1 Florida Gators 84, #S1 Ohio State Buckeyes 75
Scoring by half: 40–29, 44–46
Pts: Al Horford 18; Rebs: Al Horford 12; Asts: Taurean Green 6	Pts: Greg Oden 25; Rebs: Greg Oden 12; Asts: Mike Conley Jr. 6

Georgia Dome, Atlanta, Georgia
Attendance: 51,458

In a rematch of a regular season meeting which had been won 86–60 by Florida in Gainesville, the Gators survived 25 points and 12 rebounds from Buckeyes center Greg Oden with stellar play from guards Lee Humphrey and Taurean Green with inside contributions coming from Al Horford (18 points) and tourney Most Outstanding Player Corey Brewer. Billy Donovan became the third-youngest coach (at age 41) to win two titles. Only Bob Knight (at Indiana) and San Francisco's Phil Woolpert both won two titles at the age of 40.

The Gators are the first team ever to hold the NCAA Division I college football and basketball titles in the same academic year (2006–07) and calendar year (2006 and 2007). Coincidentally, Florida also beat Ohio State (by a score of 41–14) in the College Football Championship, the first time in college sports history that identical match-ups and results have occurred in both football and basketball championships. This was also the first time in NCAA D-I men's basketball history that exactly the same starting five were able to win back-to-back titles (Joakim Noah, Corey Brewer, Lee Humphrey, Al Horford, Taurean Green). Florida's Lee Humphrey also set the all-time NCAA Tournament record for three-point field goals made with 47. Humphrey surpassed Bobby Hurley's record of 42.

With the loss to Florida, Ohio State's record in the national championship game fell to 1–4.
