= Taurean Green =

American basketball player (born 1986)

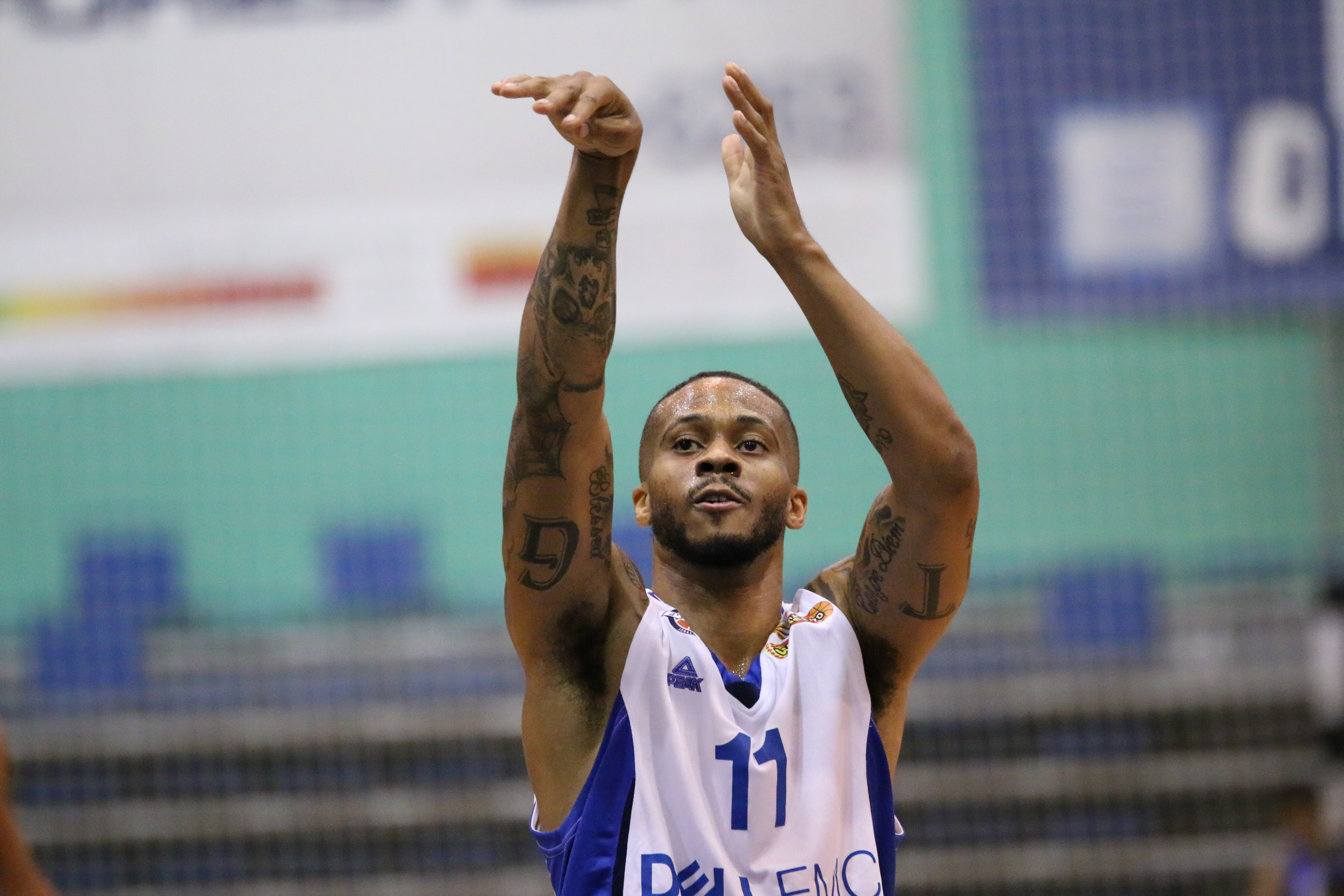
- Green playing for Bnei Herzliya in 2016

Florida Gators
- Title: Assistant coach
- League: Southeastern Conference

Personal information
- Born: November 28, 1986 (age 39) Boca Raton, Florida, U.S.
- Listed height: 6 ft 1 in (1.85 m)
- Listed weight: 177 lb (80 kg)

Career information
- High school: Cardinal Gibbons (Fort Lauderdale, Florida)
- College: Florida (2004–2007)
- NBA draft: 2007: 2nd round, 52nd overall pick
- Drafted by: Portland Trail Blazers
- Playing career: 2007–2021
- Position: Point guard
- Number: 0

Career history

Playing
- 2007–2008: Portland Trail Blazers
- 2007: →Idaho Stampede
- 2008: Denver Nuggets
- 2008: →Colorado 14ers
- 2008–2009: CAI Zaragoza
- 2009–2010: AEK Athens
- 2010–2012: Gran Canaria
- 2012: Tofaş Bursa
- 2012–2013: Sigma Barcellona
- 2013–2014: Limoges CSP
- 2014–2015: ASVEL Basket
- 2015–2016: Sidigas Avellino
- 2016: AEK Athens
- 2016–2018: Bnei Herzliya
- 2018–2019: Antibes Sharks
- 2019–2020: Le Mans Sarthe
- 2020–2021: Stal Ostrów Wielkopolski

Coaching
- 2020–2022: Chicago Bulls (player development)
- 2022–2023: Florida (dir. of player development)
- 2023–present: Florida (assistant)

Career highlights
- As player: Polish League champion (2021); LNB Pro A champion (2014); Greek League All-Star (2010); 2× NCAA champion (2006, 2007); SEC tournament MVP (2006); 2× Second-team All-SEC (2006, 2007); As assistant coach: NCAA champion (2025)
- Stats at NBA.com
- Stats at Basketball Reference

Taurean James Green (born November 28, 1986) is a Georgian-American former professional basketball player, and current assistant coach for the University of Florida. Green played college basketball for the Florida Gators where he was a member of the teams that won back-to-back NCAA national championships in 2006 and 2007. He also played internationally for Georgia after gaining citizenship in June 2010. He is the son of former NBA journeyman Sidney Green.

== Early years ==
Green was born in Boca Raton, Florida, in 1986. He attended a different school for each of his four years of high school.(Freshman/Lake Howell HS, Sophomore/Westminster Academy, Junior/Bradenton Pendleton Academy, Senior/Cardinal Gibbons HS) Following his sophomore year, in which his Westminster Academy team won the Florida Class 2A State Championship, Green was named MVP of the State Playoff Tournament and Broward County 3A-2A-1A Player of the Year. His signature game came at home during the regular season against Dillard High School, the three-time defending Class 6A State Champions, where he scored 38 points and made nine 3-point shots in leading his team to a blow-out victory. Green completed his senior season and high school career at Cardinal Gibbons High School in Fort Lauderdale, Florida.

== College career ==
Green accepted an athletic scholarship to attend the University of Florida, where he played for coach Billy Donovan's Florida Gators men's basketball team from 2004 to 2007. He was a starting member of the Gators teams that won the 2006 NCAA Men's Division I Basketball Tournament on April 3, 2006, and the 2007 NCAA Men's Division I Basketball Tournament on April 2, 2007, as well as the 2006 and 2007 SEC Tournaments. Green also passed the 1,000-point benchmark in his career at Florida, racking up over 1,170 points in just three seasons, the first of which he did not play much. Four of his former teammates have also passed the 1,000 point mark: Joakim Noah, Corey Brewer, Lee Humphrey and Al Horford.

== Professional career ==
=== NBA ===
On June 28, 2007, he was drafted in the second round, 52nd overall, by the Portland Trail Blazers in the 2007 NBA draft. In his first year with the Blazers, Green was sent to the Blazers' development league affiliate Idaho Stampede on December 9, 2007, and was recalled on the 22nd. A need to get more playing time and practice time were noted by coach Nate McMillan as the reason behind the move. On February 21, 2008, he was traded to the Denver Nuggets for Von Wafer.

On July 28, 2008, he was traded to the New York Knicks along with Bobby Jones and a 2010 second-round pick in exchange for Renaldo Balkman. However, one day later he was released by the Knicks.

=== Europe ===
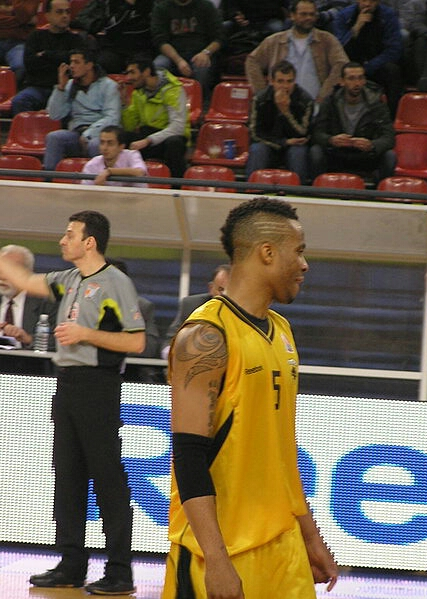
Green playing for AEK Athens in 2010

In 2008, Green signed with Basket Zaragoza 2002 of the Spanish ACB league. He debuted in the 2008 Supercopa and scored 18 points in his first game, against Joventut Badalona. On August 25, 2009, he signed with AEK Athens of the Greek Basket League. In July 2010 he returned to Spain and signed a two-year contract with CB Gran Canaria. In February 2012 he left CB Gran Canaria and signed a contract in Turkey with Tofas Bursa. In July 2013, Green signed with Limoges CSP. and won the French League title on his first season with them.

On June 20, 2014, he signed a two-year deal with ASVEL Basket. After one season, he parted ways with ASVEL. On August 16, 2015, he signed with Sidigas Avellino of Italy. On February 13, 2016, he left Avelino and returned to his former club AEK Athens for the rest of the season.

On August 15, 2016, Green signed with Israeli team Bnei Herzliya for the 2016–17 season. On June 6, 2017, Green signed a two-year contract extension with Herzliya. On January 8, 2018, Green recorded a career-high 28 points, shooting 8-for-13 from the field, along with 5 assists in an 86–82 win over Ironi Nes Ziona. Three days later, he was named Israeli League Round 12 MVP.

On November 8, 2018, Green returned to France for a second stint, signing a one-year deal with the Antibes Sharks.

On September 23, 2019, he has signed a try-out contract with Le Mans Sarthe of the LNB Pro A. He will replace injured Brandon Taylor for 8–10 weeks. On November 13, 2019, Le Mans announced the signing of Taurean Green till the end of the season.

On July 7, 2020, he has signed with Stal Ostrów Wielkopolski of the Polish Basketball League (PLK).

== The Basketball Tournament (TBT) ==
In the summer of 2017, Green played in The Basketball Tournament on ESPN for Pedro's Posse. He competed for the $2 million prize, and for Pedro's Posse, he scored 15 points in their loss to Team 23 in the first round, by a score of 107–92.

In the summer of 2023, Green played for Gataverse (Florida Alumni). He had 3 points, 1 rebound, 2 assists and 1 steal.

== National team career ==
Green has citizenship with Georgia, and he played with the senior men's Georgian national basketball team at the qualification tournament for EuroBasket 2011, where he averaged 11.0 points, 2.5 assists, 2.4 rebounds, and 0.4 steals per game.

== Coaching career ==
=== Chicago Bulls ===
In 2020–2021, Green announced his retirement from playing professional basketball and joined the Chicago Bulls as a Player Development Coordinator.

=== University of Florida ===
Green returned to Florida's men's basketball program as Director of Player Development in 2022 and served in that role in the 2022–2023 season. He helped the Gators back to the NCAA tournament in 2024 as Florida posted 24 wins in 2023–2024.

In 2023, he was promoted to Assistant Coach, Player Development for UF's men's basketball program.

==== Misconduct allegations ====
On January 16, 2025, The Independent Florida Alligator reported that a former Florida athletics employee had filed a sexual assault complaint against Green, based on an encounter in March 2024. The complaint follows in the wake of a Title IX investigation into Gators head coach Todd Golden beginning November 2024, over discredited accusations of sexual harassment and stalking. Green is continuing to coach Florida while he is being investigated.

== Career statistics ==
Legend
GP	Games played	GS	Games started	MPG	Minutes per game
FG%	Field goal percentage	3P%	3-point field goal percentage	FT%	Free throw percentage
RPG	Rebounds per game	APG	Assists per game	SPG	Steals per game
BPG	Blocks per game	PPG	Points per game	**Bold**	Career high

=== NBA ===
==== Regular season ====
Year	Team	GP	GS	MPG	FG%	3P%	FT%	RPG	APG	SPG	BPG	PPG
2007–08	Portland	8	0	**5.5**	.250	.125	**1.000**	0.5	**1.0**	**0.1**	0.0	**2.1**
2007–08	Denver	**9**	0	3.3	**.333**	**.333**	.750	**0.7**	0.3	**0.1**	0.0	1.1
Career		17	0	4.4	.280	.182	.917	0.6	0.6	0.1	0.0	1.6

=== Europe ===
Year	Team	GP	GS	MPG	FG%	3P%	FT%	RPG	APG	SPG	BPG	PPG
2008–2009	CAI Zaragoza	25	25	25.0	.432	.418	.770	2.3	2.0	1.1	0.5	10.7
2009–2010	AEK Athens	24	24	33.5	.391	.373	.836	2.8	3.5	1.5	0.0	15.2
2010–2011	Gran Canaria	29	29	24.6	.339	.296	.797	2.3	4.0	1.0	0.0	8.8
2011–2012	Gran Canaria	14	14	15.2	.237	.154	.750	0.8	2.2	0.4	0.0	3.5
2012	Tofaş Bursa	6	6	29.5	.261	.225	.773	2.0	4.3	0.5	0.0	10.4
2012–2013	Basket Barcellona	56	56	31.2	.433	.368	.907	3.4	4.8	1.7	0.0	12.6

== See also ==
- List of Florida Gators in the NBA
