= 2007 NBA draft =

Basketball player selection

General information
- Sport: Basketball
- Date: June 28, 2007
- Location: WaMu Theater at Madison Square Garden (New York City)
- Network: ESPN

Overview
- 60 total selections in 2 rounds
- League: NBA
- First selection: Greg Oden (Portland Trail Blazers)

The 2007 NBA draft was held on June 28, 2007, at the WaMu Theatre at Madison Square Garden in New York City. It was broadcast on television in 115 countries. In this draft, National Basketball Association (NBA) teams took turns selecting amateur U.S. college basketball players and other eligible players, including international players.

Freshman Greg Oden from Ohio State University was drafted first overall by the Portland Trail Blazers, who won the draft lottery. However, he missed the 2007–08 season due to microfracture surgery on his right knee during the pre-season. Another freshman, Kevin Durant, was drafted second overall from the University of Texas by the Seattle SuperSonics, and went on to win the Rookie of the Year Award for the 2007–08 season. Oden and Durant became the first freshmen to be selected with the top two picks in the draft. Al Horford, the son of former NBA player Tito Horford, was drafted third by the Atlanta Hawks. Of the three top picks, Durant has been a League MVP, a two-time finals MVP and perennial All-Star while Horford has enjoyed a solid All-Star career. Oden, however, was beset by numerous microfracture surgeries on both knees that limited him to only 82 games from 2008 to 2010.

On the night after the draft, the Seattle Supersonics traded seven-time All-Star Ray Allen along with the draft rights of the 35th pick Glen Davis to the Boston Celtics in exchange for Delonte West, Wally Szczerbiak, and the draft rights to the 5th pick, Jeff Green. The Portland Trail Blazers and the New York Knicks were also involved in a multi-player trade that sent Zach Randolph to the Knicks and Steve Francis to the Blazers. Apart from those two trades, nine further draft-day trades were announced.

The 2007 draft marked the first time three players drafted in the top 10 came from the same school: the University of Florida. Florida, the 2007 National Collegiate Athletic Association (NCAA) Basketball champion, tied the record set by the University of Connecticut in 2006 with five players selected in the first two rounds of an NBA draft. Florida joined nine other schools, including Connecticut, that had five players selected in an NBA draft, second only to UNLV, which had six players selected in the eight-round 1977 draft. Five players who competed in the 2007 NCAA Basketball National Championship Final were selected in the top 10; three players came from Florida, and two players came from the runner-up, Ohio State University. This draft also set the record number of freshmen drafted in the first round when eight freshmen were selected. Of the 60 players drafted, eight were freshmen, five were sophomores, 14 were juniors, 20 were seniors, and 13 were international players without U.S. college basketball experience. The Cleveland Cavaliers, Denver Nuggets, Indiana Pacers and Toronto Raptors all did not have a draft pick this year, although Indiana and Toronto each acquired a drafted player's rights after the draft. As of 2025, the only remaining active NBA players from this draft are Kevin Durant, Al Horford, Mike Conley, and Jeff Green.

== Draft selections ==
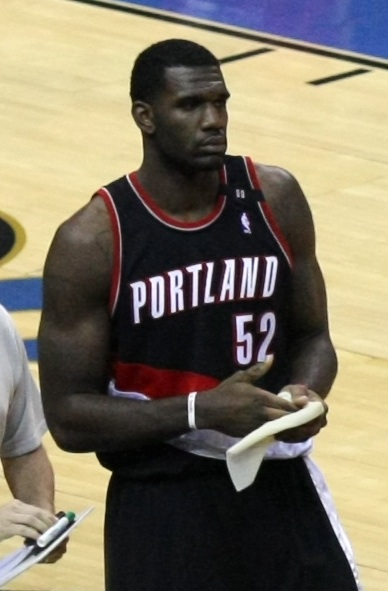
Greg Oden was selected 1st overall by the Portland Trail Blazers but was plagued with knee injuries and retired after 7 seasons.

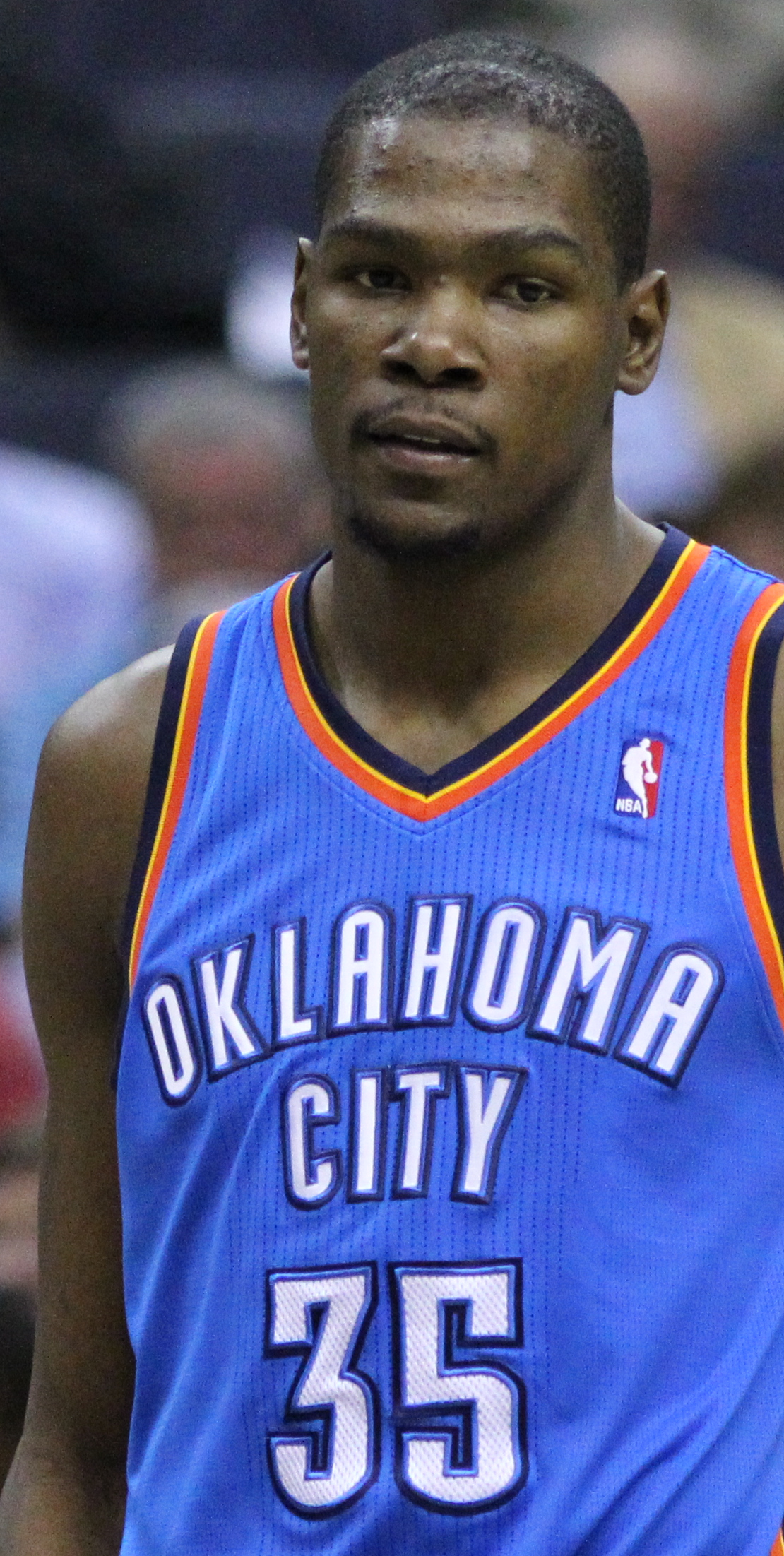
Kevin Durant was selected 2nd overall by the Seattle SuperSonics and is considered to be one of the greatest scorers of all time, winning the 2014 MVP and winning back-to-back NBA Finals MVPs in 2017 and 2018.

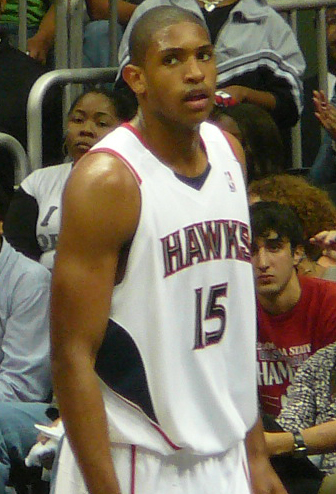
Al Horford was selected 3rd overall by the Atlanta Hawks and has been named to 5 all-star teams.

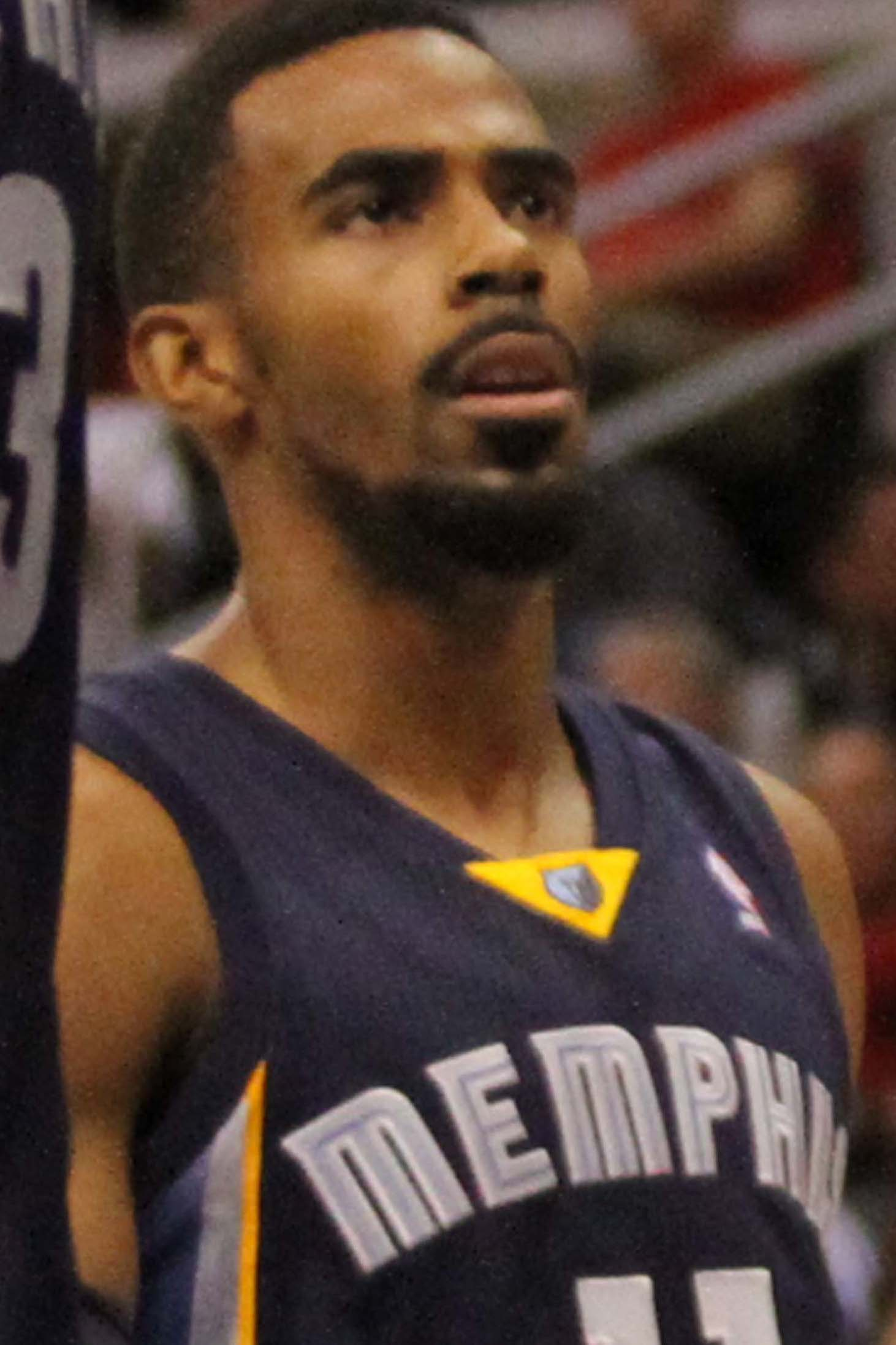
Mike Conley was selected 4th overall by the Memphis Grizzlies.

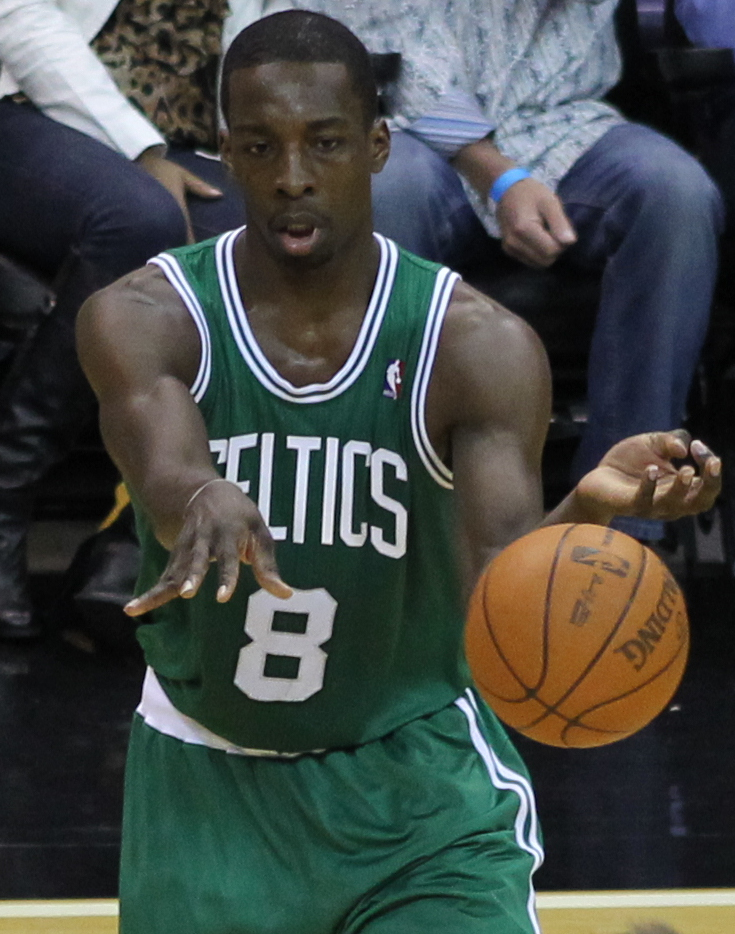
Jeff Green was selected 5th overall by the Boston Celtics. His draft rights were later traded to the Seattle SuperSonics.

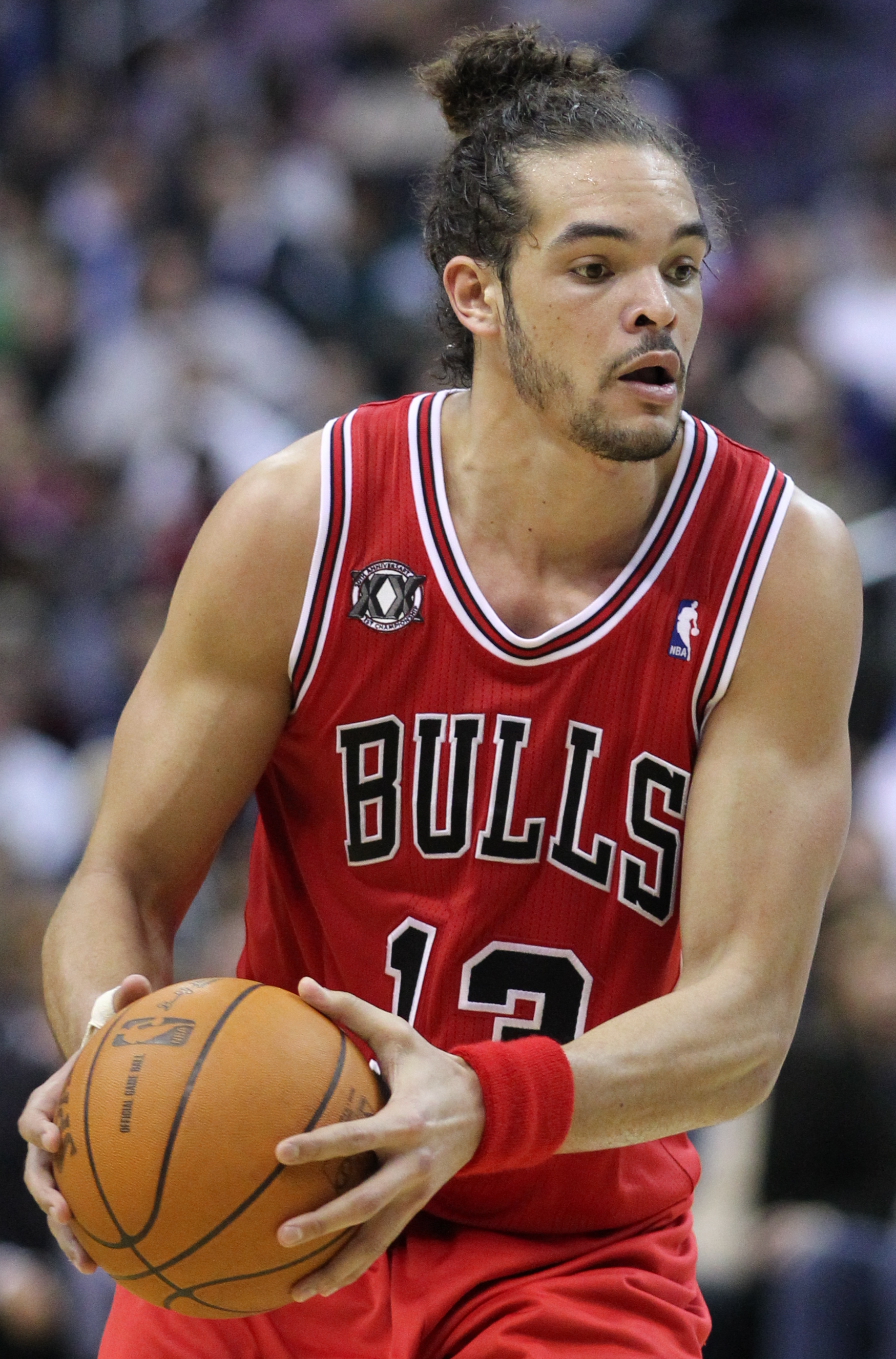
Joakim Noah was selected 9th overall by the Chicago Bulls and won Defensive Player of the Year in 2014.

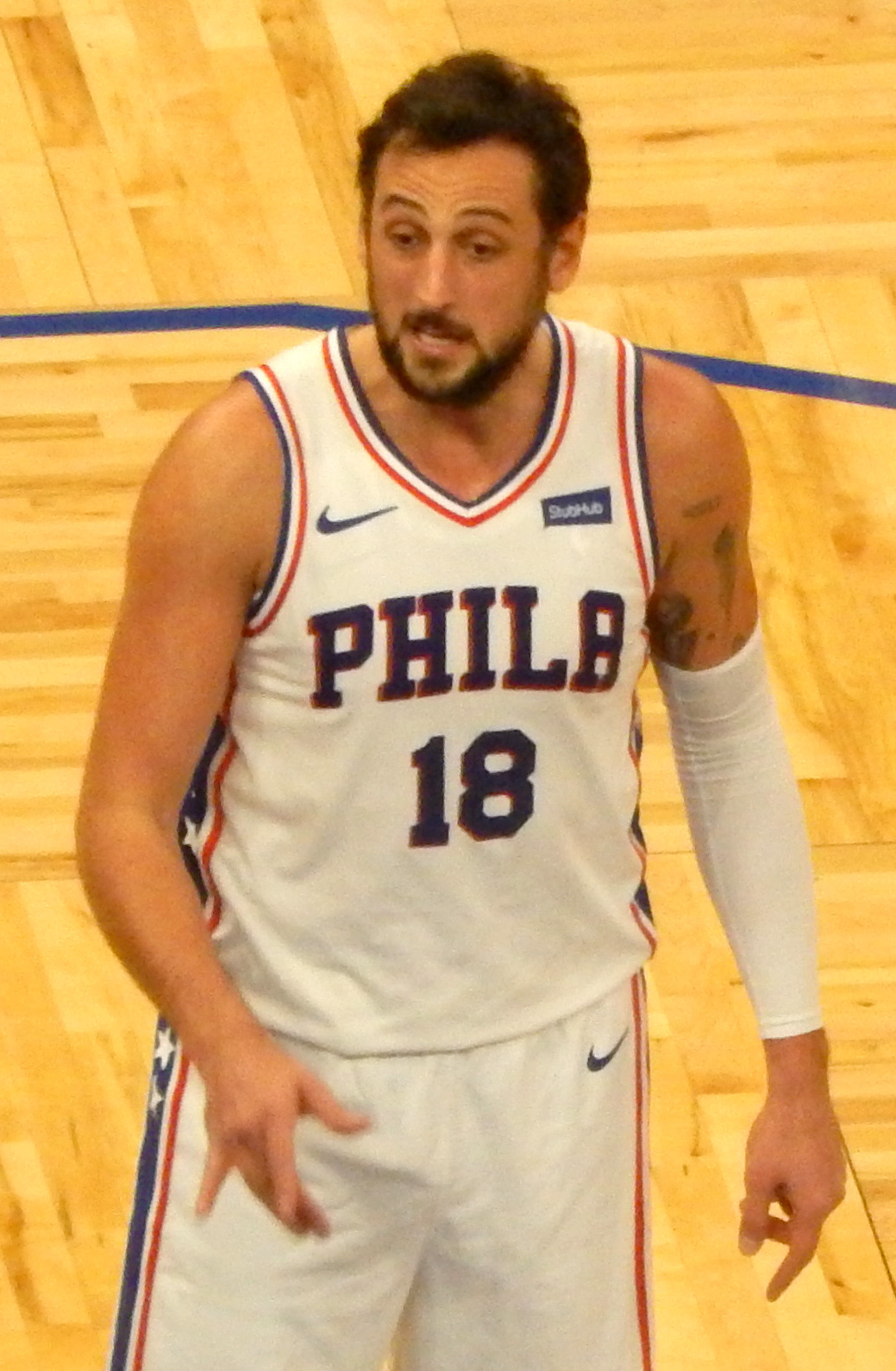
Marco Belinelli was selected 18th overall by the Golden State Warriors. He later won the 2014 NBA Championship playing with the San Antonio Spurs.

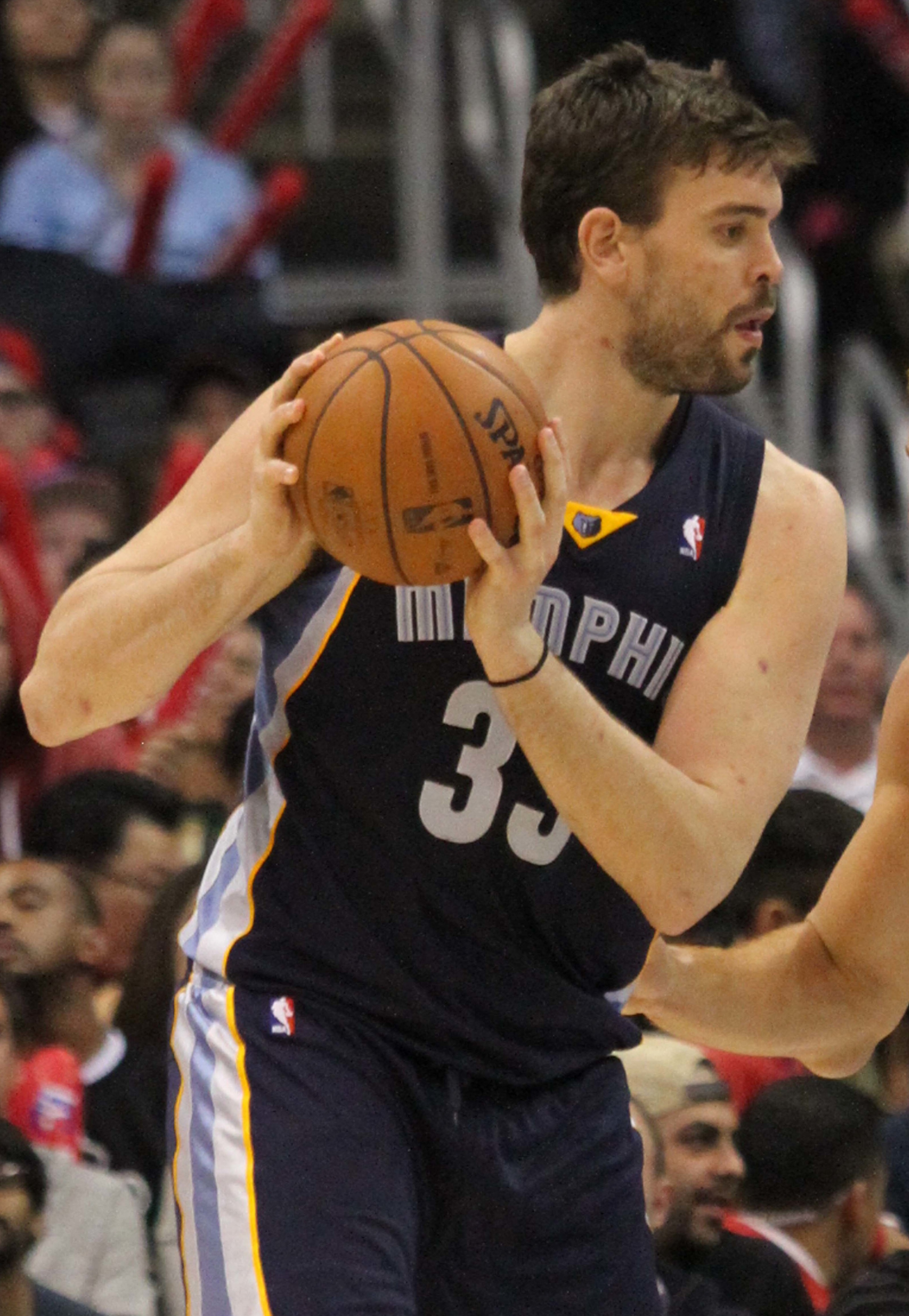
Marc Gasol was selected 48th overall by the Los Angeles Lakers. His draft rights were later traded to the Memphis Grizzlies, where he made multiple All-Star teams and All-NBA teams.

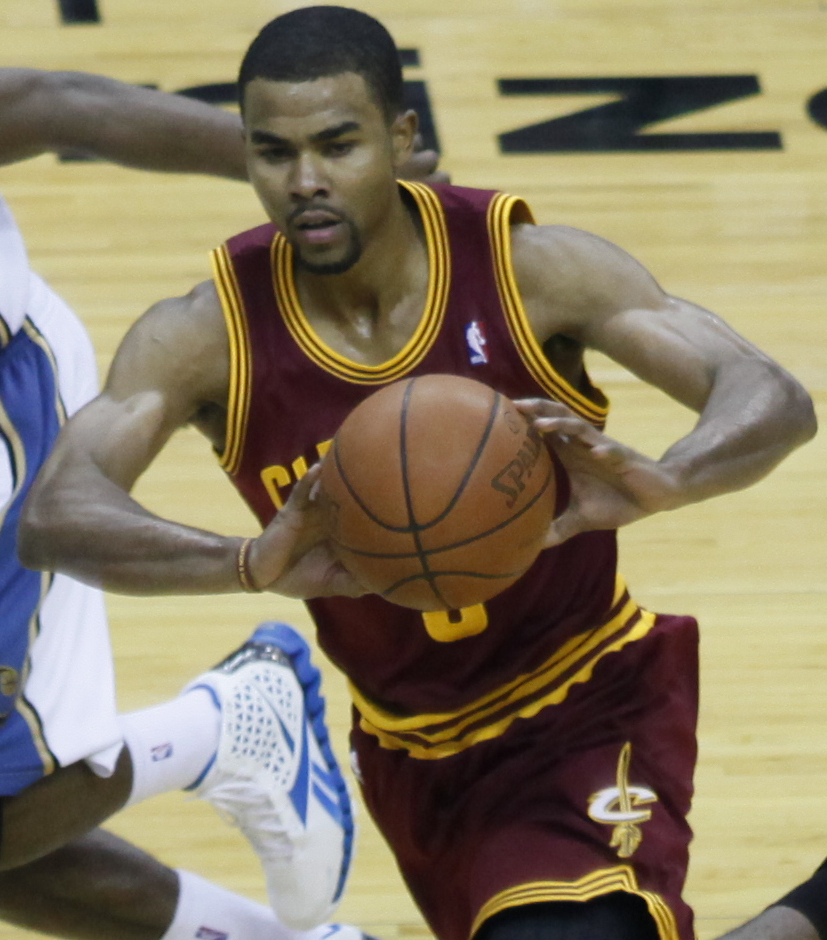
Ramon Sessions was selected 56th overall by the Milwaukee Bucks.

PG	Point guard	SG	Shooting guard	SF	Small forward	PF	Power forward	C	Center

*	Denotes player who has been selected for at least one All-Star Game and All-NBA Team
^{+}	Denotes player who has been selected for at least one All-Star Game
^{#}	Denotes player who has never appeared in an NBA regular-season or playoff game
^{~}	Denotes player who has been selected as Rookie of the Year

Round	Pick	Player	Position	Nationality (Note: Nationality indicates the player's national team or representative nationality. If a player has not competed at the international level, then the nationality indicates the national team which the player is eligible to represent according to FIBA rules.)	Team	School/club team
1	1	Greg Oden	C	United States	Portland Trail Blazers	Ohio State (Fr.)
1	2	Kevin Durant^{*~}	SF	United States	Seattle SuperSonics	Texas (Fr.)
1	3	Al Horford^{*}	C	Dominican Republic	Atlanta Hawks	Florida (Jr.)
1	4	Mike Conley^{+}	PG	United States	Memphis Grizzlies	Ohio State (Fr.)
1	5	Jeff Green	SF	United States	Boston Celtics (traded to Seattle SuperSonics)^{[a]}	Georgetown (Jr.)
1	6	Yi Jianlian	PF	China	Milwaukee Bucks	Guangdong Southern Tigers (China)
1	7	Corey Brewer	SF	United States	Minnesota Timberwolves	Florida (Jr.)
1	8	Brandan Wright	PF	United States	Charlotte Bobcats (traded to Golden State)^{[b]}	North Carolina (Fr.)
1	9	Joakim Noah^{*}	C	France; United States	Chicago Bulls (from New York)^{[l]}	Florida (Jr.)
1	10	Spencer Hawes	C	United States	Sacramento Kings	Washington (Fr.)
1	11	Acie Law	PG	United States	Atlanta Hawks (from Indiana)^{[m]}	Texas A&M (Sr.)
1	12	Thaddeus Young	PF	United States	Philadelphia 76ers	Georgia Tech (Fr.)
1	13	Julian Wright	SF	United States	New Orleans Hornets	Kansas (So.)
1	14	Al Thornton	SF	United States	Los Angeles Clippers	Florida State (Sr.)
1	15	Rodney Stuckey	SG	United States	Detroit Pistons (from Orlando)^{[n]}	Eastern Washington (So.)
1	16	Nick Young	SG	United States	Washington Wizards	USC (Jr.)
1	17	Sean Williams	PF	United States	New Jersey Nets	ege (Jr.)
1	18	Marco Belinelli	SG	Italy	Golden State Warriors	Fortitudo Bologna (Italy)
1	19	Javaris Crittenton	PG	United States	Los Angeles Lakers	Georgia Tech (Fr.)
1	20	Jason Smith	PF	United States	Miami Heat (traded to Philadelphia)^{[c]}	Colorado State (Jr.)
1	21	Daequan Cook	SG	United States	Philadelphia 76ers (from Denver,^{[o]} traded to Miami)^{[c]}	Ohio State (Fr.)
1	22	Jared Dudley	SF	United States	Charlotte Bobcats (from Toronto via Cleveland)^{[p]}	Boston College (Sr.)
1	23	Wilson Chandler	SF	United States	New York Knicks (from Chicago)^{[l]}	DePaul (So.)
1	24	Rudy Fernández	SG	Spain	Phoenix Suns (from Cleveland via Boston,^{[q]} traded to Portland)^{[d]}	Joventut Badalona (Spain)
1	25	Morris Almond	SG	United States	Utah Jazz	Rice (Sr.)
1	26	Aaron Brooks	PG	United States	Houston Rockets	Oregon (Sr.)
1	27	Arron Afflalo	SG	United States	Detroit Pistons	UCLA (Jr.)
1	28	Tiago Splitter	C	Brazil	San Antonio Spurs	TAU Cerámica (Spain)
1	29	Alando Tucker	SF	United States	Phoenix Suns	Wisconsin (Sr.)
1	30	Petteri Koponen^{#}	SG	Finland	Philadelphia 76ers (from Dallas via Golden State and Denver,^{[o]} traded to Portland)^{[e]}	Tapiolan Honka (Finland)
2	31	Carl Landry	PF	United States	Seattle SuperSonics (from Memphis,^{[s]} traded to Houston)^{[f]}	Purdue (Sr.)
2	32	Gabe Pruitt	PG	United States	Boston Celtics	USC (Jr.)
2	33	Marcus Williams	SF	United States	San Antonio Spurs (from Milwaukee)^{[t]}	Arizona (So.)
2	34	Nick Fazekas	PF	United States; Japan	Dallas Mavericks (from Atlanta)^{[u]}	Nevada (Sr.)
2	35	Glen Davis	PF	United States	Seattle SuperSonics (traded to Boston)^{[a]}	LSU (Jr.)
2	36	Jermareo Davidson	PF	United States	Golden State Warriors (from Minnesota,^{[v]} traded to Charlotte)^{[b]}	Alabama (Sr.)
2	37	Josh McRoberts	PF	United States	Portland Trail Blazers	Duke (So.)
2	38	Kyrylo Fesenko	C	Ukraine	Philadelphia 76ers (from New York via Chicago,^{[w]} traded to Utah)^{[g]}	SK Cherkassy (Ukraine))
2	39	Stanko Barać^{#}	C	Croatia	Miami Heat (from Sacramento via Utah and Orlando,^{[x]} traded to Indiana)^{[h]}	Široki Brijeg (Bosnia and Herzegovina)
2	40	Sun Yue	SF	China	Los Angeles Lakers (from Charlotte)^{[y]}	Beijing Olympians (ABA)
2	41	Chris Richard	PF	United States	Minnesota Timberwolves (from Philadelphia)^{[z]}	Florida (Sr.)
2	42	Derrick Byars	SG	United States	Portland Trail Blazers (from Indiana,^{[aa]} traded to Philadelphia)^{[e]}	Vanderbilt (Sr.)
2	43	Adam Haluska^{#}	SG	United States	New Orleans Hornets	Iowa (Sr.)
2	44	Reyshawn Terry^{#}	SF	United States	Orlando Magic (traded to Dallas)^{[i]}	North Carolina (Sr.)
2	45	Jared Jordan^{#}	PG	United States	Los Angeles Clippers	Marist (Sr.)
2	46	Stephane Lasme	PF	Gabon	Golden State Warriors (from New Jersey)^{[ab]}	Massachusetts (Sr.)
2	47	Dominic McGuire	SF	United States	Washington Wizards	Fresno State (Jr.)
2	48	Marc Gasol^{*}	C	Spain	Los Angeles Lakers	Akasvayu Girona (Spain)
2	49	Aaron Gray	C	United States	Chicago Bulls (from Golden State via Phoenix, Boston and Denver)^{[ac]}	Pittsburgh (Sr.)
2	50	Renaldas Seibutis^{#}	SG	Lithuania	Dallas Mavericks (from Miami via L.A. Lakers)^{[ad]}	Maroussi (Greece)
2	51	JamesOn Curry	PG	United States	Chicago Bulls (from Denver)^{[ac]}	Oklahoma State (Jr.)
2	52	Taurean Green	PG	Georgia	Portland Trail Blazers (from Toronto)^{[ae]}	Florida (Jr.)
2	53	Demetris Nichols	SF	United States	Portland Trail Blazers (from Chicago,^{[af]} traded to New York)^{[j]}	Syracuse (Sr.)
2	54	Brad Newley^{#}	SF	Australia	Houston Rockets (from Cleveland via Orlando)^{[ag]}	Townsville Crocodiles (Australia)
2	55	Herbert Hill^{#}	PF	United States	Utah Jazz (traded to Philadelphia)^{[g]}	Providence (Sr.)
2	56	Ramon Sessions	PG	United States	Milwaukee Bucks (from Houston)^{[ah]}	Nevada (Jr.)
2	57	Sammy Mejia^{#}	SG	Dominican Republic	Detroit Pistons	DePaul (Sr.)
2	58	Georgios Printezis^{#}	PF	Greece	San Antonio Spurs (traded to Toronto)^{[k]}	Olympia Larissa (Greece)
2	59	D. J. Strawberry	PG	United States	Phoenix Suns	Maryland (Sr.)
2	60	Milovan Raković^{#}	C	Serbia	Dallas Mavericks (traded to Orlando)^{[i]}	Mega Ishrana (Serbia)

a: Yi Jianlian's year of birth has been widely disputed, with several sources claiming that Chinese basketball authorities falsified his year of birth from 1984 to 1987 to allow him a longer period of competition in international junior tournaments. A dedicated section of Yi's Wikipedia article discusses this issue and includes sources.
b: Joakim Noah, who was born in the United States to a French father and a Swedish mother, has dual U.S. and French citizenship. He has represented France internationally since 2011.
c: Taurean Green, who was born in the United States, became a naturalized citizen of Georgia in 2010. He has represented Georgia internationally since 2010.

== Notable undrafted players ==
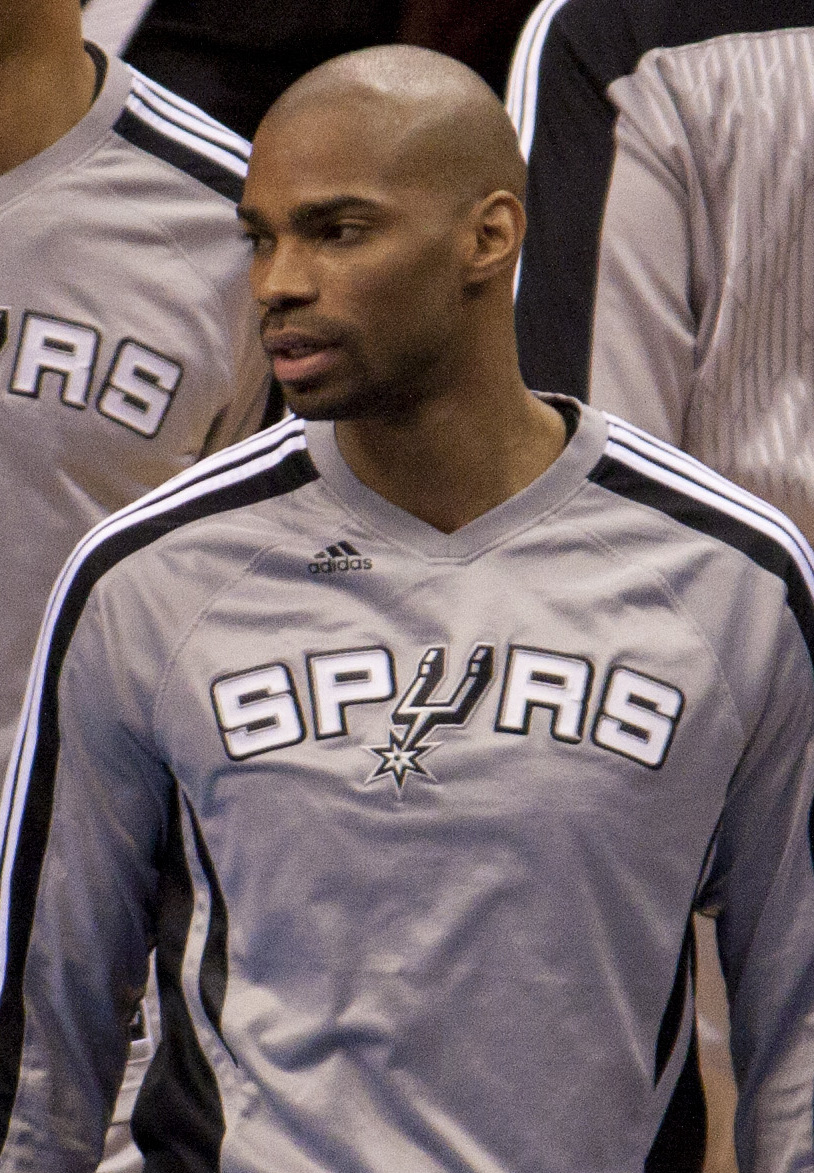
Gary Neal, not selected in the draft, signed with the San Antonio Spurs in 2010

These players were not selected in the 2007 NBA draft but have played at least one game in the NBA.

Player	Position	Nationality	School/club team
Blake Ahearn	PG	United States	Missouri State (Sr.)
Joel Anthony	C	Canada	UNLV (Sr.)
Gustavo Ayón	C/PF	Mexico	Baloncesto Fuenlabrada (Spain)
Bobby Brown	PG	United States	Cal State Fullerton (Sr.)
Eric Dawson	PF/C	United States	Midwestern State (Sr.)
Zabian Dowdell	PG	United States	Virginia Tech (Sr.)
Andre Ingram	SG	United States	American (Sr.)
Ivan Johnson	PF	United States	Cal State San Bernardino (Sr.)
Trey Johnson	SG	United States	Jackson State (Sr.)
Coby Karl	SG	United States	Boise State (Sr.)
Oliver Lafayette	PG/SG	United States; Croatia	Houston (Sr.)
Cartier Martin	SF/SG	United States	Kansas State (Sr.)
Gary Neal	SG	United States	Towson (Sr.)
Mustafa Shakur	PG	United States	Arizona (Sr.)
Courtney Sims	C	United States	Michigan (Sr.)
Mirza Teletović	PF	Bosnia and Herzegovina	Saski Baskonia (Spain)
Anthony Tolliver	PF	United States	Creighton (Sr.)
Darryl Watkins	C	United States	Syracuse (Sr.)
Mario West	G	United States	Georgia Tech (Sr.)

== Draft lottery ==
The first 14 picks in the draft belonged to teams that had missed the playoffs; the order was determined through a lottery. The lottery would determine the three teams that would obtain the first three picks on the draft. The remaining first-round picks and the second-round picks were assigned to teams in reverse order of their win–loss record in the previous season. On April 20, 2007, the NBA performed a tie-breaker to determine the order of the picks for teams with identical win–loss record.

The lottery was held on May 22, 2007, in Secaucus, New Jersey. The Portland Trail Blazers, who had the seventh-worst record in the previous season, won the lottery with just a 5.3% chance to win. This was the fourth time that the Blazers had the first overall draft pick and the first time that the Blazers won the draft lottery since it was introduced in 1985. The Seattle Supersonics, who had the fifth-worst record, and the Atlanta Hawks, who had the fourth-worst record, obtained the second and third pick, respectively.

Three teams who had the worst records—the Memphis Grizzlies, the Boston Celtics and the Milwaukee Bucks—obtained the fourth, fifth and sixth pick, respectively. These were the lowest possible picks they could have obtained through the lottery. The most recent draft in which the three worst teams did not receive the top three picks was in 1993.

Below were the chances for each team to get specific picks in the 2007 draft lottery, rounded to three decimal places:

^	Denotes the actual lottery results

Team	2006–07 record	Lottery chances	Pick													
Team	2006–07 record	Lottery chances	1st	2nd	3rd	4th	5th	6th	7th	8th	9th	10th	11th	12th	13th	14th
Memphis Grizzlies	22–60	250	.250	.215	.178	.357^	—	—	—	—	—	—	—	—	—	—
Boston Celtics	24–58	199	.199	.188	.171	.319	.123^	—	—	—	—	—	—	—	—	—
Milwaukee Bucks	28–54	156	.156	.157	.156	.226	.265	.041^	—	—	—	—	—	—	—	—
Atlanta Hawks	30–52	119	.119	.126	.133^	.099	.350	.161	.013	—	—	—	—	—	—	—
Seattle SuperSonics	31–51	88	.088	.097^	.107	—	.261	.359	.084	.004	—	—	—	—	—	—
Minnesota Timberwolves	32–50	53	.053	.060	.070	—	—	.439	.331^	.046	.001	—	—	—	—	—
Portland Trail Blazers	32–50	53	.053^	.060	.070	—	—	—	.572	.226	.018	.000	—	—	—	—
Charlotte Bobcats	33–49	19	.019	.022	.027	—	—	—	—	.725^	.196	.011	.000	—	—	—
New York Knicks	33–49	19	.019	.022	.027	—	—	—	—	—	.784^	.143	.005	.000	—	—
Sacramento Kings	33–49	18	.018	.021	.025	—	—	—	—	—	—	.846^	.087	.002	.000	—
Indiana Pacers	35–47	8	.008	.009	.012	—	—	—	—	—	—	—	.907^	.063	.001	.000
Philadelphia 76ers	35–47	7	.007	.008	.010	—	—	—	—	—	—	—	—	.935^	.039	.000
New Orleans Hornets	39–43	6	.006	.007	.009	—	—	—	—	—	—	—	—	—	.960^	.018
Los Angeles Clippers	40–42	5	.005	.006	.007	—	—	—	—	—	—	—	—	—	—	.982^

1: Atlanta Hawks' pick would be conveyed to the Phoenix Suns if it was not in the top three.^{[r]}
2: New York Knicks' pick was conveyed to the Chicago Bulls.^{[l]}
3: Indiana Pacers' pick was conveyed to the Atlanta Hawks because it was not in the top ten.^{[m]}

== Eligibility ==
The basic requirements for draft eligibility are:

- All drafted players must be at least 19 years of age during the calendar year of the draft (i.e., born on or before December 31, 1988).
- Any player who is not an "international player", as defined in the Collective Bargaining Agreement (CBA), must be at least one year removed from the graduation of his high school class.

The CBA defines "international players" as players who permanently resided outside the U.S. for three years before the draft, did not complete high school in the U.S., and have never enrolled at a U.S. college or university.

The basic requirement for automatic eligibility for a U.S. player is the completion of his college eligibility. Players who meet the CBA definition of "international players" are automatically eligible if their 22nd birthday falls during or before the calendar year of the draft (i.e., born on or before December 31, 1985).

A player who is not automatically eligible must declare his eligibility for the draft by notifying the NBA offices in writing no later than 60 days before the draft. An early entry candidate is allowed to withdraw his eligibility for the draft by notifying the NBA offices in writing no later than 10 days before the draft. On June 19, 2007, NBA announced that 32 college players and 6 international players had filed as early-entry candidates for the 2007 Draft, while 46 players who had previously declared as early entry candidates had withdrawn from the draft.

=== Early entrants ===
==== College underclassmen ====
The following college basketball players successfully applied for early draft entrance.

- (United States) Arron Afflalo – G, UCLA (junior)
- (United States) Shagari Alleyne – C, Manhattan (junior)
- (United States) Corey Brewer – F, Florida (junior)
- (United States) Dwight Brewington – G, Liberty (junior)
- (United States) Wilson Chandler – F, DePaul (sophomore)
- (United States) Mike Conley Jr. – G, Ohio State (freshman)
- (United States) Daequan Cook – G, Ohio State (freshman)
- (United States) Javaris Crittenton – G, Georgia Tech (freshman)
- (United States) JamesOn Curry – G, Oklahoma State (junior)
- (United States) Glen Davis – F, LSU (junior)
- (United States) Kevin Durant – F, Texas (freshman)
- (United States) Jeff Green – F, Georgetown (junior)
- (United States) Taurean Green – G, Florida (junior)
- (United States) Spencer Hawes – C, Washington (freshman)
- (Dominican Republic) Al Horford – F, Florida (junior)
- (United States) Robert Earl Johnson – F, Clinton JC (freshman)
- (United States) Kellen Lee – F, Los Angeles CC (freshman)
- (United States) Dominic McGuire – F, Fresno State (junior)
- (United States) Josh McRoberts – F, Duke (sophomore)
- (United States) Joakim Noah – F, Florida (junior)
- (United States) Greg Oden – C, Ohio State (freshman)
- (United States) Kendaris Pelton – G, Martin Methodist (junior)
- (United States) Gabe Pruitt – G, USC (junior)
- (United States) Ramon Sessions – G, Nevada (junior)
- (United States) Jason Smith – F, Colorado State (junior)
- (United States) Rodney Stuckey – G, Eastern Washington (sophomore)
- (United States) Marcus Williams – F/G, Arizona (sophomore)
- (United States) Sean Williams – F, Boston College (junior)
- (United States) Brandan Wright – F, North Carolina (freshman)
- (United States) Julian Wright – F, Kansas (sophomore)
- (United States) Nick Young – G, USC (junior)
- (United States) Thaddeus Young – F, Georgia Tech (freshman)

==== International players ====
The following international players successfully applied for early draft entrance.

- Ralfi Silva Ansaloni – C, Praia Club (Brazil)
- (Croatia) Stanko Barać – C, Široki Brijeg (Bosnia and Herzegovina)
- Marco Belinelli – G, Fortitudo Bologna (Italy)
- Kyrylo Fesenko – F/C, SK Cherkassy (Ukraine)
- Yi Jianlian – F, Guangdong Southern Tigers (China)
- Petteri Koponen – G, Tapiolan Honka (Finland)

== Invited attendees ==
The 2007 NBA draft is considered to be the 29th NBA draft to have utilized what is properly considered the "green room" experience for NBA prospects. The NBA's green room is a staging area where anticipated draftees often sit with their families and representatives, waiting for their names to be called on draft night. Often being positioned either in front of or to the side of the podium (in this case, being positioned somewhere within what was known at the time as the WaMu Theater at Madison Square Garden), once a player heard his name, he would walk to the podium to shake hands and take promotional photos with the NBA commissioner. From there, the players often conducted interviews with various media outlets while backstage. From there, the players often conducted interviews with various media outlets while backstage. However, once the NBA draft started to air nationally on TV starting with the 1980 NBA draft, the green room evolved from players waiting to hear their name called and then shaking hands with these select players who were often called to the hotel to take promotional pictures with the NBA commissioner a day or two after the draft concluded to having players in real-time waiting to hear their names called up and then shaking hands with David Stern, the NBA's commissioner at the time.

The NBA compiled its list of green room invites through collective voting by the NBA's team presidents and general managers alike, which in this year's case belonged to only what they believed were the top 15 prospects at the time. Despite having the same number of invites for this year's draft as the previous year's draft, there would still be a couple notable discrepancies involved with the invitations at hand between the missing invitation for the #12 pick, Thaddeus Young, to showcase the perfect top 16 invitation listing this year and arguably a missing invitation for future All-Star Marc Gasol (brother of Hall of Famer Pau Gasol) to go with it. With that in mind, the following players were invited to attend this year's draft festivities live and in person.

- (United States) Corey Brewer – SF, Florida
- (United States) Mike Conley – PG, Ohio State
- (United States) Kevin Durant – SF/PF, Texas
- (United States) Jeff Green – SF/PF, Georgetown
- (United States) Spencer Hawes – C/PF, Washington
- (Dominican Republic) Al Horford – PF/C, Florida
- (United States) Acie Law – PG, Texas A&M
- (United States) Greg Oden – C, Ohio State
- (France) / (Sweden) / (United States) Joakim Noah – C, Florida
- (United States) Rodney Stuckey – PG/SG, Eastern Washington
- (United States) Al Thornton – SF/PF, Florida State
- (United States) Brandan Wright – PF/C, North Carolina
- (United States) Julian Wright – PF/C, Kansas
- Yi Jianlian – PF/C, Guangdong Southern Tigers (China)
- (United States) Nick Young – SG, USC

== Trades involving draft picks ==
=== Draft-day trades ===
The following trades involving drafted players were made on the day of the draft.

- ^{a 1} ^{2} Seattle acquired Wally Szczerbiak, Delonte West, the draft rights to 5th pick Jeff Green and a 2008 second-round draft pick from Boston in exchange for Ray Allen and the draft rights to 35th pick Glen Davis.
- ^{b 1} ^{2} Golden State acquired the draft rights to 8th pick Brandan Wright from Charlotte in exchange for Jason Richardson and the draft rights to 36th pick Jermareo Davidson.
- ^{c 1} ^{2} Philadelphia acquired the draft rights to 20th pick Jason Smith from Miami in exchange for the draft rights to 21st pick Daequan Cook, a 2009 second-round draft pick and cash considerations.
- ^{d} Portland acquired James Jones and the draft rights to 24th pick Rudy Fernández from Phoenix in exchange for cash considerations. The trade was finalized on July 11, 2007.
- ^{e 1} ^{2} Portland acquired the draft rights to 30th pick Petteri Koponen from Philadelphia in exchange for the draft rights to 42nd pick Derrick Byars and cash considerations.
- ^{f} Houston acquired the draft rights to 31st pick Carl Landry from Seattle in exchange for a 2008 second-round draft pick and cash considerations.
- ^{g 1} ^{2} Utah acquired the draft rights to 38th pick Kyrylo Fesenko from Philadelphia in exchange for the draft rights to 55th pick Herbert Hill and future draft considerations.
- ^{h} Indiana acquired the draft rights to 39th pick Stanko Barać from Miami in exchange for a 2009 second-round draft pick.
- ^{i 1} ^{2} Dallas acquired the draft rights to 44th pick Reyshawn Terry from Orlando in exchange for the draft rights to 60th pick Milovan Raković.
- ^{j} New York acquired Zach Randolph, Dan Dickau, Fred Jones and the draft rights to 53rd pick Demetris Nichols from Portland in exchange for Steve Francis, Channing Frye and a 2008 second-round draft pick.
- ^{k} Toronto acquired the draft rights to 58th pick Giorgos Printezis from San Antonio in exchange for a 2008 second-round draft pick.

=== Pre-draft trades ===
Before the draft, the following trades were made and resulted in exchanges of draft picks between the teams.

- ^{l 1} ^{2} ^{3} On October 4, 2005, Chicago acquired an option to swap 2007 first-round draft picks, a 2006 first-round draft pick, 2007 and 2009 second-round draft picks, Tim Thomas, Michael Sweetney and Jermaine Jackson from New York in exchange for Eddy Curry and Antonio Davis. The options to swap 2007 first-round draft picks were exercised, hence Chicago acquired New York's first-round draft pick and New York acquired Chicago's first-round draft pick. Chicago used the 9th pick to draft Joakim Noah and New York used the 23rd pick to draft Wilson Chandler.
- ^{m 1} ^{2} On August 22, 2006, Atlanta acquired a 2007 first-round draft pick and cash considerations from Indiana in exchange for Al Harrington and John Edwards. Atlanta used the 11th pick to draft Acie Law.
- ^{n} On February 15, 2006, Detroit acquired a 2007 first-round draft pick and Kelvin Cato from Orlando in exchange for Darko Miličić and Carlos Arroyo. Detroit used the 15th pick to draft Rodney Stuckey.
- ^{o 1} ^{2} On December 19, 2006, Philadelphia acquired Denver's and Dallas' 2007 first-round draft picks, Andre Miller and Joe Smith from Denver in exchange for Allen Iverson and Ivan McFarlin. Previously, Denver acquired Dallas' 2007 first-round draft pick, Eduardo Nájera and Luis Flores on February 24, 2005, from Golden State in exchange for Rodney White and Nikoloz Tskitishvili. Earlier, Golden State acquired two future first-round draft picks, Eduardo Nájera, Christian Laettner, the draft rights to Luis Flores and Mladen Šekularac and cash considerations on August 24, 2004, from Dallas in exchange for Erick Dampier, Evan Eschmeyer, Dan Dickau and the draft rights to Steve Logan. Denver used the 21st and 30th picks to draft Daequan Cook and Petteri Koponen, respectively.
- ^{p} On June 23, 2004, Charlotte acquired Toronto's 2007 first-round draft pick from Cleveland in exchange for Sasha Pavlović. Previously, Cleveland acquired a 2007 first-round draft pick and Michael Stewart on September 25, 2002, from Toronto in exchange for Lamond Murray and a 2004 second round draft pick. Charlotte used the 22nd pick to draft Jared Dudley.
- ^{q} On June 28, 2006, Phoenix acquired Cleveland's 2007 first-round draft pick from Boston in exchange for Brian Grant, the draft rights to Rajon Rondo and cash considerations. Previously, Boston acquired a 2007 first-round draft pick on February 24, 2005, from Cleveland in exchange for Jiří Welsch. Phoenix used the 24th pick to draft Rudy Fernández.
- ^{r} On August 19, 2005, Phoenix acquired 2006 and future first-round draft picks and Boris Diaw from Atlanta in exchange for Joe Johnson. Atlanta's 2007 first-round draft pick was top-three protected and hence the pick was not conveyed to Phoenix. Instead, Atlanta would convey their 2008 first-round draft pick to Phoenix.
- ^{s} On June 28, 2005, Seattle acquired 2006 and 2007 second-round draft picks from Memphis in exchange for the draft rights to Lawrence Roberts. Seattle used the 31st pick to draft Carl Landry.
- ^{t} On June 28, 2006, San Antonio acquired a 2007 second-round draft pick from Milwaukee in exchange for the draft rights to Damir Markota. San Antonio used the 33rd pick to draft Marcus Williams.
- ^{u} On February 22, 2007, Dallas acquired a 2007 second-round draft pick from Atlanta in exchange for Anthony Johnson. Dallas used the 34th pick to draft Nick Fazekas.
- ^{v} On February 21, 2002, Golden State acquired a 2007 second-round draft pick and Dean Garrett from Minnesota in exchange for Marc Jackson. Golden State used the 36th pick to draft Jermareo Davidson.
- ^{w} On June 28, 2006, Philadelphia acquired New York's 2007 second-round draft pick, the draft rights to Rodney Carney and cash considerations from Chicago in exchange for the draft rights to Thabo Sefolosha. Previously, Chicago acquired an option to swap 2007 first-round draft picks, a 2006 first-round draft pick, 2007 and 2009 second-round draft picks, Tim Thomas, Michael Sweetney and Jermaine Jackson on October 4, 2005, from New York in exchange for Eddy Curry and Antonio Davis. Philadelphia used the 38th pick to draft Kyrylo Fesenko.
- ^{x} On June 7, 2007, Miami acquired Sacramento's 2007 and Miami's 2008 second-round draft picks from Orlando as part of the hiring of Stan Van Gundy as Orlando's head coach. Previously, Orlando acquired Sacramento's second-round draft pick and DeShawn Stevenson on February 19, 2004, from Utah in exchange for Gordan Giriček. Earlier, Utah acquired 2004 and 2007 second-round draft picks and Keon Clark on August 3, 2003, from Sacramento in exchange for a 2004 second-round draft pick. Miami used the 39th pick to draft Stanko Barać.
- ^{y} On October 26, 2005, the L.A. Lakers acquired a 2007 second-round draft pick from Charlotte in exchange for Jumaine Jones. The L.A. Lakers used the 40th pick to draft Sun Yue.
- ^{z} On June 28, 2006, Minnesota acquired a 2007 second-round draft pick and cash considerations from Philadelphia in exchange for the draft rights to Bobby Jones. Minnesota used the 41st pick to draft Chris Richard.
- ^{aa} On June 28, 2006, Portland acquired 2007 and 2008 second-round draft picks and the draft rights to Alexander Johnson from Indiana in exchange for the draft rights to James White. Portland used the 42nd pick to draft Derrick Byars
- ^{ab} On February 14, 2005, Golden State acquired 2005 and 2007 second-round draft picks from New Jersey in exchange for Clifford Robinson. Golden State used the 46th pick to draft Stéphane Lasme.
- ^{ac 1} ^{2} On July 20, 2006, Chicago acquired Denver's and Golden State's 2007 second-round draft picks and Howard Eisley from Denver in exchange for J. R. Smith. Previously, Denver acquired Golden State's 2007 second-round draft pick on June 28, 2006, from Boston in exchange for the draft rights to Leon Powe. Beforehand, Boston acquired Golden State's 2007 second-round draft pick on February 8, 2005, from Phoenix in exchange for Walter McCarty and cash considerations. Earlier, Phoenix acquired 2007 and 2009 second-round draft picks on January 3, 2005, from Golden State in exchange for Žarko Čabarkapa. Chicago used the 49th and 51st picks to draft Aaron Gray and JamesOn Curry.
- ^{ad} On June 28, 2006, Dallas acquired Miami's 2007 second-round draft pick from the L.A. Lakers in exchange for the draft rights to J. R. Pinnock. Previously, the L.A. Lakers acquired a 2006 first-round draft pick, a 2007 second-round draft pick, Lamar Odom, Caron Butler and Brian Grant on July 14, 2004, from Miami in exchange for Shaquille O'Neal. Dallas used the 50th pick to draft Renaldas Seibutis.
- ^{ae} On October 10, 1997, Portland acquired a 2007 second-round draft pick from Toronto in a three-team trade with Toronto and New York. Portland used the 52nd pick to draft Taurean Green.
- ^{af} On June 28, 2006, Portland acquired a 2007 second-round draft pick and the draft rights to LaMarcus Aldridge from Chicago in exchange for the draft rights to Tyrus Thomas and Viktor Khryapa. Portland used the 53rd pick to draft Demetris Nichols.
- ^{ag} Hours before the start of the draft, Houston acquired the 54th pick from Orlando in exchange for cash considerations. Previously, Orlando acquired 2005 and 2007 second-round draft picks and Tony Battie on July 23, 2004, from Cleveland in exchange for Drew Gooden, Steven Hunter and Anderson Varejão. Houston used the 54th pick to draft Brad Newley.
- ^{ah} On February 24, 2005, Milwaukee acquired 2006 and 2007 second-round draft picks and Reece Gaines from Houston in exchange for Mike James and Zendon Hamilton. Milwaukee used the 56th pick to draft Ramon Sessions.

== See also ==
- List of first overall NBA draft picks
