= Greg Oden =

American basketball player and coach (born 1988)

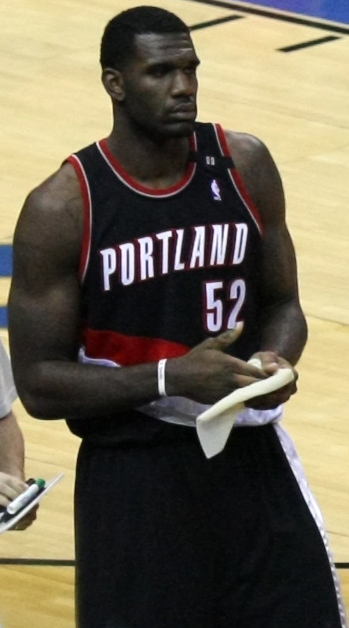
- Oden with the Portland Trail Blazers in 2008

Personal information
- Born: January 22, 1988 (age 38) Buffalo, New York, U.S.
- Listed height: 7 ft 0 in (2.13 m)
- Listed weight: 273 lb (124 kg)

Career information
- High school: Lawrence North (Indianapolis, Indiana)
- College: Ohio State (2006–2007)
- NBA draft: 2007: 1st round, 1st overall pick
- Drafted by: Portland Trail Blazers
- Playing career: 2007–2016
- Position: Center
- Number: 52, 20

Career history
- 2007–2012: Portland Trail Blazers
- 2013–2014: Miami Heat
- 2015–2016: Jiangsu Dragons

Career highlights
- Consensus second-team All-American (2007); NABC Defensive Player of the Year (2007); Pete Newell Big Man Award (2007); First-team All-Big Ten (2007); Big Ten Freshman of the Year (2007); Big Ten Conference tournament MOP (2007); National high school player of the year (2006); McDonald's All-American (2006); 2× First-team Parade All-American (2005, 2006); Third-team Parade All-American (2004); 2× Gatorade National Player of the Year (2005, 2006); 2× USA Today High School Player of the Year (2005, 2006); Indiana Mr. Basketball (2006)

Career NBA statistics
- Points: 840 (8.0 ppg)
- Rebounds: 656 (6.2 rpg)
- Blocks: 130 (1.2 bpg)
- Stats at NBA.com
- Stats at Basketball Reference

Gregory Wayne Oden Jr. (born January 22, 1988) is an American former professional basketball player. Oden, a 7 ft 0 in (2.13 m) center, played college basketball for the Ohio State Buckeyes for one season, during which the team was the Big Ten Conference regular season champion and Big Ten Conference men's basketball tournament champion with Oden as the tournament MOP. Additionally, the Buckeyes were the tournament runner-up in the NCAA Men's Division I Basketball Championship.

On June 28, 2007, Oden was selected first overall in the 2007 NBA draft by the Portland Trail Blazers. He underwent microfracture surgery of the knee in September 2007 and missed the entire 2007–08 NBA season as a result. Oden recovered and made his NBA debut on opening night 2008. In March 2012, he was waived by the Trail Blazers after missing the previous two seasons due to injuries. Oden signed with the Miami Heat in August 2013, more than three years after last appearing in an NBA game, and played with the team through the 2014 NBA playoffs.

After playing in the Chinese Basketball Association during its 2015–16 season, Oden stated in October 2016 that he was done with basketball and would not be returning as a player. In July 2018, he played in The Basketball Tournament 2018. In May 2019, Oden was selected as the seventh overall pick in the 2019 Big3 Draft.

== Early years ==
Oden was born on January 22, 1988, in Buffalo, New York, and moved with his family to Terre Haute, Indiana at age nine. He attended Sarah Scott Middle School in Terre Haute, where he first played interscholastic basketball. Oden then relocated with his mother and brother and attended Lawrence North High School in Indianapolis, Indiana, which he led to three consecutive Indiana Class 4A basketball championships before graduating in 2006. Oden was named Parade's High School Co-Player of the Year 2005 (along with Monta Ellis) and 2005 National Boys Basketball Player of the Year. He repeated as Gatorade National Boys Basketball Player of the Year in 2006. Oden was also named the 2006 Indiana Mr. Basketball. He was also on the McDonald's All-American Team and played in the All-American game, and earned first-team Parade All-American honors for the second straight year.

== College career ==
On June 29, 2005, Oden and Lawrence North teammate Mike Conley Jr. announced that they would be attending Ohio State University starting with the 2006–07 season.

On June 16, 2006, Oden had surgery on his right wrist in Indianapolis to repair a ligament injury that occurred late in his senior high school season. As a result, Oden sat on the Ohio State bench during the beginning of the 2006–07 season, during which the Buckeyes were ranked as high as #1 before losing to North Carolina. He made his college debut on December 2, 2006, against Valparaiso, coming off the bench. Oden finished the game with 14 points, 10 rebounds, and five blocks. In December of that year, Steve Kerr described him as a "once-in-a-decade player".

The Big Ten honored Oden as Player of the Week, along with Wisconsin's Alando Tucker, on January 29, 2007. In the previous week, he had averaged 18 points and 11.5 rebounds. On March 6, 2007, Oden was named First Team All-Big Ten as well being voted the conference's Defensive Player of the Year. Going into the NCAA Tournament, Ohio State was viewed as heavy favorites due mostly to the efforts of Oden viewed as a consensus top player along with Kevin Durant. Oden fouled out for the first time in his college career against Xavier in the second round of the NCAA Tournament, and was bothered by foul trouble throughout the tournament. In the Sweet Sixteen, Oden blocked a potential game-winning shot in the final seconds against Tennessee to preserve an 85–84 victory and went on to lead Ohio State past Memphis and Georgetown to advance to the 2007 National Championship. In the title game, Oden scored 25 points and had 12 rebounds and four blocked shots in a losing effort against the Florida Gators.

Oden, alongside Kevin Durant, Arron Afflalo, Alando Tucker, and Acie Law were named to the Associated Press All-American Team. Oden and Durant were the first freshmen voted to the All-American First Team since 1990, and the third and fourth overall. Throughout his high school and college career, Oden never lost a home game.

== Professional career ==
=== Portland Trail Blazers (2007–2012) ===
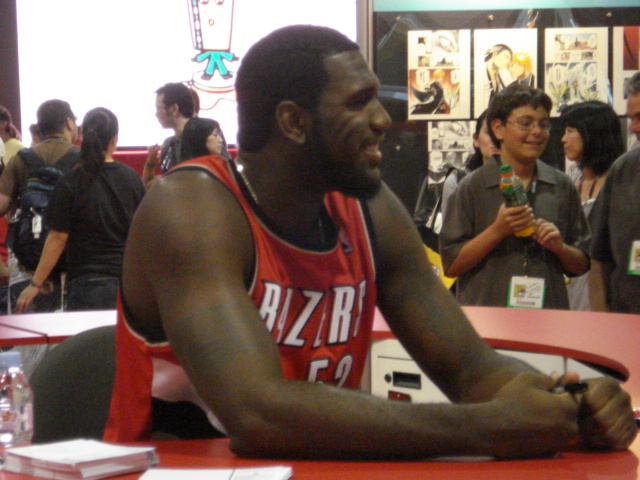
Oden at the 2008 San Diego Comic-Con

On April 20, 2007, Oden announced that he would be entering the 2007 NBA draft. Oden was selected by the Portland Trail Blazers with the #1 overall pick. To begin his Trail Blazers career, Oden chose the uniform number 52. On July 1, before his first NBA practice, Oden was signed to a contract which provided for two guaranteed seasons and team options for third and fourth seasons. On September 14, 2007, Oden had microfracture surgery on his ailing right knee. He missed the entire season. Oden's progress was recorded on the Trail Blazers' website and his blog.

Although drafted in 2007, Oden was classified as a rookie for the 2008–09 season because of the knee injury. Entering the 2008–09 season, he was listed at 250 lb (110 kg), but according to Blazers' trainer Jay Jensen, Oden weighed about 290 lb (130 kg) in July. Oden left his NBA debut with a foot injury after playing thirteen scoreless minutes against the Los Angeles Lakers. He returned on November 12, 2008, after missing two weeks, and scored his first NBA points in the first quarter against the Miami Heat. On January 19, 2009, Oden had a career-high 24 points while also grabbing 15 rebounds in a 102–85 victory over the Milwaukee Bucks. On February 13, 2009, he injured his left knee in a game against the Golden State Warriors, by bumping knees with opponent Corey Maggette, and missed three weeks due to a chipped knee cap.

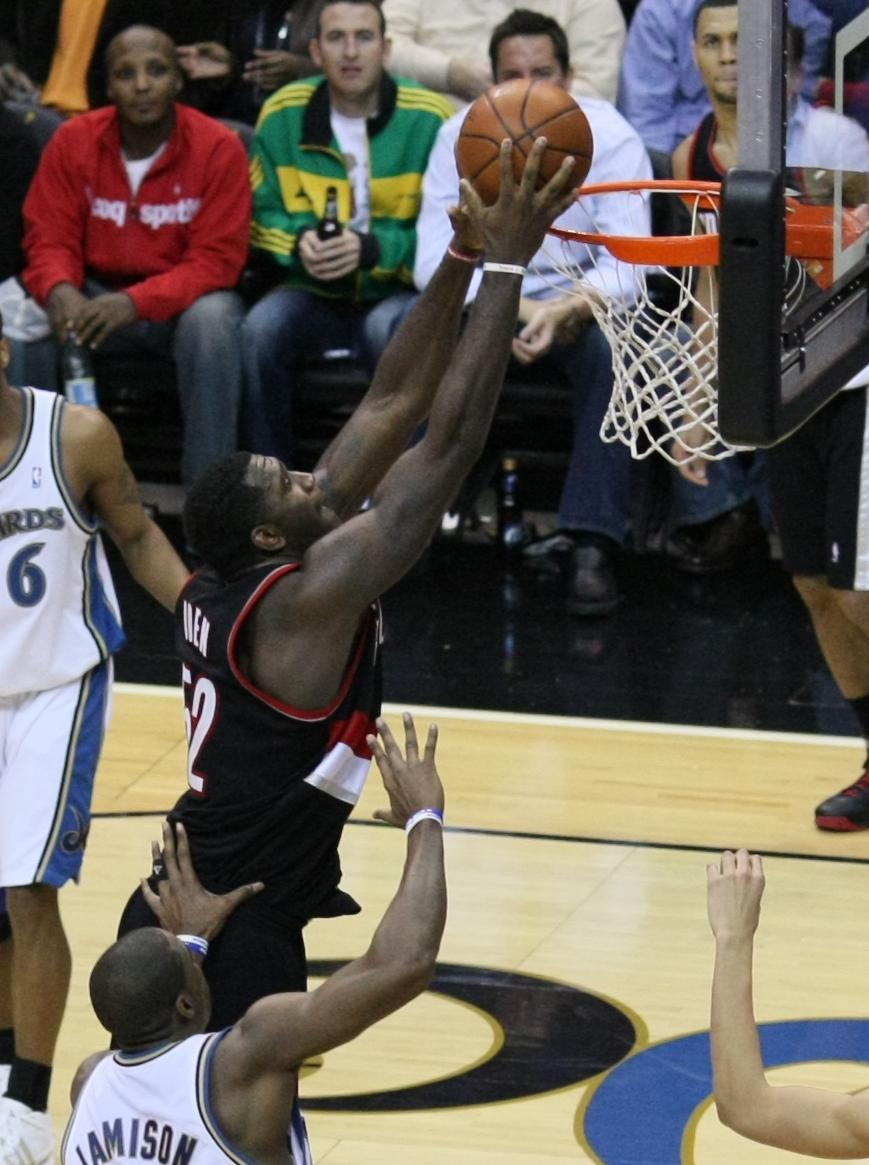
Oden dunking in a game against the Washington Wizards

On November 23, 2009, Oden matched his career-high for points in a game again with 24. He set a new career-high for rebounds in a game with 20 on December 1. Four days later, Oden injured his left knee in the first quarter of a game. He was taken off the court on two connected stretchers. Later, Oden underwent surgery for a fractured left patella and missed the rest of the season. That injury marked the second time Oden had missed major playing time due to injury.

On November 17, 2010, the team announced that Oden would have microfracture surgery on his left knee, ending his 2010–11 season. The injury marked Oden's third NBA season cut short due to a knee injury.

On December 9, 2011, the Trail Blazers announced that Oden had suffered an unspecified "setback" that left them less optimistic about his ability to play in the 2011–12 season. Rather than signing an $8.9 million qualifying offer, Oden and the team negotiated a different offer. On February 3, 2012, he underwent arthroscopic surgery on his right knee. On February 20, Oden was scheduled for a procedure on his left knee similar to the procedure he underwent 17 days earlier. However, during the operation, further damage to the articular cartilage was discovered, and Oden underwent his third micro-fracture surgery.

On March 15, 2012, Oden was waived by the Trail Blazers to create room on the roster for trade acquisitions. In May 2012, Oden announced his intention to sit out the 2012–13 season to focus on rehabbing his injuries. In January 2013, it was reported that several teams were interested in signing Oden for the 2013–14 season.

=== Miami Heat (2013–2014) ===
On August 7, 2013, Oden signed a one-year deal with the Miami Heat. He played in his first NBA game since December 5, 2009, in a preseason game against the New Orleans Pelicans on October 23, 2013. Oden managed to score two points through a dunk attempt and grabbed two rebounds in four minutes of play.

On January 15, 2014, Oden made his long-awaited return to the court. In his first regular-season game since December 2009, he recorded six points and two rebounds in eight minutes during a 114–97 loss to the Washington Wizards. On February 23, Oden made his first start since December 2009 in the Heat's 93–79 win over the Chicago Bulls. He played in three playoff games in that year. The Heat made the 2014 NBA Finals where they faced the San Antonio Spurs; Oden played a minute each in Game 3 and Game 4, recording only a personal foul in the latter. The Heat went on to lose the series in five games.

=== Jiangsu Dragons (2015–2016) ===
In March 2015, Oden was reported to be working out with the Memphis Grizzlies, while he also returned to his alma mater, Ohio State, to undergo some "high-level training" with Thad Matta, then Ohio State basketball team coach. Matta stated that since September 2014, Oden had been working out with the other Ohio State coaches. In June 2015, Oden had workouts with the Charlotte Hornets and the Dallas Mavericks. He told the media that he was attempting an NBA comeback with plans to return to the league for the 2016–17 season.

On August 26, 2015, Oden signed a one-year, $1.2 million contract with the Jiangsu Dragons of the Chinese Basketball Association. On December 9, he recorded a season-high 22 points and 14 rebounds in a win over Shandong. On February 1, 2016, Oden parted ways with Jiangsu. In 25 games for the club, he averaged 13 points, 12.6 rebounds, and two blocks per game.

In July 2018, Oden agreed to play as a reserve with the Scarlet & Gray, a team of Ohio State alumni who competed in The Basketball Tournament 2018, a $2 million winner-take-all summer tournament. Oden made his debut for Scarlet & Gray on July 27, scoring 11 points in 16 minutes of playing time. Scarlet & Gray fell to Team Fredette on July 29, with Oden playing nine minutes while recording two points, an assist, and a block.

== Post-playing career ==
On April 12, 2016, Oden was hired by the Ohio State Buckeyes men's basketball team to be the student manager for the team while he went back to finish his degree at the college. In 2019, Oden graduated from Ohio State with a bachelor's degree in sport industry.

On November 21, 2019, Edyoucore Sports & Entertainment announced that Oden had joined their team as an athlete advisor.

In April 2022, Oden joined Thad Matta's staff at Butler University as director of basketball operations. He left the Butler coaching staff in 2024 to rejoin Edyoucore Sports & Entertainment as the director of player development.

== Personal life ==
On August 11, 2014, Oden was charged with battery for punching his ex-girlfriend in the face leaving her face bloodied and swollen four days prior in Lawrence, Indiana. He pleaded guilty in 2015 to battery with moderate bodily injury, and the other three charges were dropped. Oden was put on probation and ordered to pay a fine and attend counseling.

Oden married his wife Sabrina in 2017. They have one child, a daughter born in 2016.

== Career statistics ==
=== NBA ===
Legend
GP	Games played	GS	Games started	MPG	Minutes per game
FG%	Field goal percentage	3P%	3-point field goal percentage	FT%	Free throw percentage
RPG	Rebounds per game	APG	Assists per game	SPG	Steals per game
BPG	Blocks per game	PPG	Points per game	**Bold**	Career high

==== Regular season ====
Year	Team	GP	GS	MPG	FG%	3P%	FT%	RPG	APG	SPG	BPG	PPG
2008–09	Portland	**61**	**39**	21.5	.564	—	.637	7.0	.5	**.4**	1.1	8.9
2009–10	Portland	21	21	**23.9**	**.605**	—	**.766**	**8.5**	**.9**	**.4**	**2.3**	**10.0**
2013–14	Miami	23	6	9.2	.551	—	.565	2.3	.0	.3	.6	2.9
Career		105	66	19.3	.574	—	.658	6.2	.5	.4	1.2	8.0

==== Playoffs ====
Year	Team	GP	GS	MPG	FG%	3P%	FT%	RPG	APG	SPG	BPG	PPG
2009	Portland	**6**	0	**16.0**	**.524**	—	**.667**	**4.3**	.0	**.3**	**.8**	**5.0**
2014	Miami	3	0	2.3	.000	—	—	.3	**.3**	**.3**	.0	.0
Career		9	0	11.4	.524	—	.667	3.0	.1	.3	.6	3.3

=== CBA ===
Year	Team	GP	GS	MPG	FG%	3P%	FT%	RPG	APG	SPG	BPG	PPG
2015–16	Jiangsu	25	2	26.8	.538	—	.526	12.6	.5	.6	2.0	13.0
Career		25	2	26.8	.538	—	.526	12.6	.5	.6	2.0	13.0

=== College ===
Year	Team	GP	GS	MPG	FG%	3P%	FT%	RPG	APG	SPG	BPG	PPG
2006–07	Ohio State	32	31	28.9	.616	—	.628	9.6	.7	.6	3.3	15.7
Career		32	31	28.9	.616	—	.628	9.6	.7	.6	3.3	15.7

== See also ==
- 2006 high school boys basketball All-Americans

Awards and achievements
Preceded by Luke Zeller	Indiana Mr. Basketball award 2006	Succeeded by Eric Gordon
