= Lee Humphrey =

American basketball player (born 1984)

- Humphrey in 2007

Personal information
- Born: April 23, 1984 (age 42) Maryville, Tennessee, U.S.
- Listed height: 6 ft 2 in (1.88 m)
- Listed weight: 192 lb (87 kg)

Career information
- High school: Maryville (Maryville, Tennessee)
- College: Florida (2003–2007)
- NBA draft: 2007: undrafted
- Playing career: 2007–2015
- Position: Shooting guard

Career history
- 2007: PAOK Thessaloniki
- 2007–2008: Energa Czarni
- 2008–2011: ratiopharm Ulm
- 2011–2012: Rio Grande Valley Vipers
- 2012–2013: Denain
- 2013–2014: Kyiv
- 2014: Alba Fehérvár
- 2014–2015: BC Juventus

Career highlights
- 2× NCAA champion (2006, 2007); Tennessee Mr. Basketball (2003)

Lee Anthony Humphrey (born April 23, 1984) is an American former professional basketball player. Humphrey played college basketball for the University of Florida, and was a starting guard for the Florida Gators teams that won back-to-back NCAA national championships in 2006 and 2007. He set both the season and career records at Florida for three-point field goals, making 113 in back-to-back seasons and 288 in his college career.

== Early years ==
Humphrey was born in Maryville, Tennessee in 1984. He attended Maryville High School, where he played high school basketball for the Maryville Rebels. As a senior, he was named Tennessee's Class AAA Mr. Basketball for the 2002–03 season after averaging 27.6 points, 8.0 rebounds and 7.0 assists.

== College career ==
Humphrey accepted an athletic scholarship to attend the University of Florida in Gainesville, Florida, and he played for coach Billy Donovan's Florida Gators men's basketball team from 2003 to 2007. He emerged as a prolific weapon from outside the arc during the 2005–06 season in which he hit several clutch three-pointers, including three in the Final Four against George Mason and the championship game against UCLA. The 73–57 win over UCLA was the clincher of Florida's first national basketball championship. The Gators finished the season with a 33–6 mark.

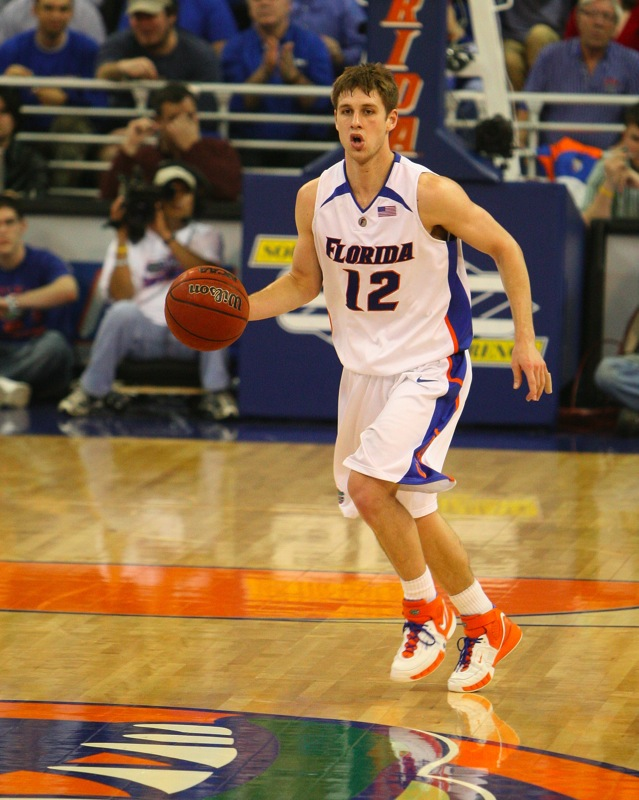
Humphrey playing for Florida

Humphrey's dominance continued during the 2006–07 campaign and with the other members of the starting five returning, the Gators rolled to a 35–5 record. On March 23, 2007, in the St. Louis regional NCAA tournament game against the Oregon Ducks, the game was delayed 10 minutes after a three-point shot Humphrey made damaged the net. During the 2007 Final Four, he hit four three-point shots in his team's 76–66 victory against UCLA in becoming the record holder for most three-pointers made during the NCAA tournament, surpassing former Duke star Bobby Hurley. On April 2, 2007, he won a second NCAA basketball championship with the Florida Gators, scoring 14 points in an 84–75 victory over the Ohio State Buckeyes. This win established Florida as the first team to repeat as NCAA basketball champions since Duke, in 1991 and 1992.

Humphrey was also a proven academic success, becoming just the second Gators basketball player to be named a first-team Academic All-American. Humphrey also served as the President of the Fellowship of Christian Athletes Chapter at the University of Florida. He graduated from the university with a bachelor of science degree in applied physiology and kinesiology in 2007.

=== Statistics ===
Season	GP-GS	MP	FGM-FGA	FG pct	3PT att	3PT pct	FT-FTA	FT pct	REB	A	TO	Blk	STL	PF-DQ	TP	Pts/game
Career statistics
2003–2004	26–11	494	34–72	.472	25–57	.439	5–9	.556	31	29	23	0	11	18–0	98	3.8
2004–2005	32–6	521	52–130	.400	37–100	.370	14–21	.667	31	31	24	0	15	35–1	155	4.8
2005–2006	38–32	1138	142–299	.475	113–246 *	.459	18–30	.600	71	72	39	0	28	43–0	415	10.9
2006–2007	40–40	1214	145–305	.475	113–246 *	.459	9–13	.692	51	50	45	0	19	53–0	412	10.3
Totals	106–89	3367	373–806	.456	288–649 *	.431	46–73	.629	184	182	131	0	73	149–1	1080	7.5
SEC statistics
2003–2004	16–7	341	25–54	.463	18–43	.419	2.3	.667	24	24	16	0	9	12–0	70	4.4
2004–2005	16–5	285	27–65	.415	19–51	.373	5–9	.556	18	30	12	0	7	16–0	78	4.9
2005–2006	15–9	428	52–121	.430	38–97	.392	4–7	.571	27	26	13	0	13	18–0	146	9.7
2006–2007	16–16	508	62–124	.500	48–94	.511	3–4	.750	15	20	18	0	10	24–0	175	10.9
Totals	63–37	1562	166–364	.452	123–285	.424	14–23	.636	84	100	59	0	39	70–0	469	7.5
NCAA tournament statistics
2003–2004	1–1	27	0–0	.000	0–0	.000	0–0	.000	0	0	1	0	0	0–0	0	0.0
2004–2005	2–0	25	2–6	.333	2–5	.400	1–2	.500	0	0	2	0	0	2–0	7	3.5
2005–2006	6–6	205	25–55	.455	22–48	.458	5–7	.714	12	9	6	0	3	8–0	77	12.8
2006–2007	6–6	199	26–54	.481	23–49	.469	0–1	.000	7	4	7	0	2	9–0	75	12.5
Totals	15–12	456	53–115	.461	47–102	.461	6–10	.600	19	15	16	0	5	19–0	159	9.3
* Florida Basketball Record. SEC Record. NCAA Record.

=== Records ===
NCAA Basketball

- Most made 3-point field goals NCAA tournament play: 55 in 14 games
- Most consecutive games making a 3-point field goal in a season: 39 games from 11/14/06-4/2/07

Florida Basketball

- Most 3-point field goals in a season: 113 in both the 2005–2006 and 2006–2007 seasons
- Most 3-point field goals in a career: 288

== Professional career ==
On June 30, 2007, Humphrey accepted an offer from the Washington Wizards to participate in their summer league but was cut. He then crossed the Atlantic, signing on with PAOK, one of Greece's best-known club teams. When the team signed a third American player, Humphrey was cut due to league rules that limit team rosters to two American players. He spent the second half of the 2007–2008 season in Poland playing for Energa Czarni, but saw limited minutes. In July 2008, Humphrey signed a one-year contract with Ratiopharm Ulm, a south German team playing in the Basketball Bundesliga (first German division). After spending the 2011–12 season in the NBA Developmental League, he signed with Denain of France's second-tier league. On December 27, 2014, he signed with BC Juventus of the Lithuanian League. On January 7, 2015, he left Juventus due to back issues. He played 2 games averaging 6 points.

Season	Team	GP	MP	FGM-FGA	FG pct	3PT att	3PT pct	FT-FTA	FT pct	REB	A	TO	Blk	STL	PF	TP	Pts/game	Ref
2007–2008	PAOK Thessaloniki	4	99	13–36	.361	9–27	.333	0–0	.000	2	2	4	0	2	2	35	8.8	
2007–2008	Energa Czarni	5	Unk	Unk	Unk	Unk	Unk	Unk	Unk	Unk	Unk	Unk	Unk	Unk	Unk	6	1.2	
2008–2009	Ratiopharm Ulm	36	1018	132–295	.448	90–205	.439	38–49	.776	41	24	43	0	17	54	392	10.9	
2009–2010	Ratiopharm Ulm	33	890	90–237	.380	64–174	.368	23–29	.793	48	40	39	1	16	41	267	8.1	

== Personal life ==
Humphrey is married to his college sweetheart Chelsea, and father to sons Oliver and Jude After retirement from professional basketball, he joined Pontoon Solutions in 2015, where he became the Sales Director in April 2021. He also received his Master of Business Administration from Florida International University – College of Business in 2015. Starting with the 2021–22 NCAA men's basketball season, Humphrey has been an analyst for the radio broadcasts of Florida Gators men's basketball games.

== See also ==
- 2005–06 Florida Gators men's basketball team
- 2006–07 Florida Gators men's basketball team
- Florida Gators
