= 2006–07 Big Ten Conference men's basketball season =

American college basketball season

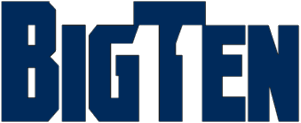
- League: NCAA Division I
- Sport: Basketball
- Duration: November 2006 through March 2007
- Teams: 11
- TV partner(s): Big Ten Network, ESPN, CBS

2007–08 NCAA Division I season
- Champion: Ohio State (15–1)
- Runners-Up: Wisconsin (13–3)
- Season MVP: Alando Tucker – Wisconsin

Tournament
- Venue: United Center, Chicago, Illinois
- Champions: Ohio State
- Runners-up: Wisconsin

Basketball seasons
- ← 05–06 07–08 →

2006–07 Big Ten Conference men's basketball standings
	Conf.				Overall
Team	W		L	PCT	W		L	PCT
No. 1 Ohio State†	15	–	1	.938	35	–	4	.897
No. 6 Wisconsin	13	–	3	.813	30	–	6	.833
Indiana	10	–	6	.625	21	–	11	.656
Iowa	9	–	7	.563	17	–	14	.548
Purdue	9	–	7	.563	22	–	12	.647
Illinois	9	–	7	.563	23	–	12	.657
Michigan State	8	–	8	.500	23	–	12	.657
Michigan	8	–	8	.500	22	–	13	.629
Minnesota	3	–	13	.188	9	–	22	.290
Penn State	2	–	14	.125	13	–	18	.419
Northwestern	2	–	14	.125	11	–	19	.367
† 2007 Big Ten tournament winner As of March 13, 2007; Rankings from AP Poll

The 2006–07 Big Ten Conference men's basketball season began with the 2006–07 NCAA Division I men's basketball season in November. The season marked the 102nd season of Big Ten play. Ohio State won the Big Ten Conference regular season championship by two games over Wisconsin. Wisconsin's Alando Tucker was named Big Ten Player of the Year.

Ohio State also won the Big Ten tournament by defeating Wisconsin. As a result of the win, Ohio State received the conference's automatic bid to the 2007 NCAA Men's Division I Basketball Tournament. Six Big Ten teams (Illinois, Indiana, Michigan State, Ohio State, Purdue, and Wisconsin) were invited to the NCAA tournament. Ohio State advanced to the National Championship game before losing to Florida.

Michigan received a bid to the National Invitation Tournament and lost in the second round.

== Preconference schedules ==
=== ACC–Big Ten Challenge ===
ACC team	Big Ten team	Outcome	Location	ACC	B10
**NC State**	Michigan	NCSU 74–67	Raleigh, North Carolina	X	
**No. 19 Maryland**	Illinois	UMD 72–66	Champaign, Illinois	X	
Florida State	**No. 13 Wisconsin**	WISC 81–66	Madison, Wisconsin		**X**
**No. 24 Georgia Tech**	Penn State	GT 77–73	Atlanta, Georgia	X	
**No. 10 Duke**	Indiana	Duke 54–51	Durham, North Carolina	X	
Miami	**Northwestern**	NW 61–59	Evanston, Illinois		**X**
**Boston College**	Michigan State	BC 65–58	Chestnut Hill, Massachusetts	X	
Virginia	**Purdue**	PUR 61–59	West Lafayette, Indiana		**X**
**Virginia Tech**	Iowa	VT 69–65	Blacksburg, Virginia	X	
**No. 6 North Carolina**	No. 1 Ohio State	UNC 98–89	Chapel Hill, North Carolina	X	
**Clemson**	Minnesota	CLEM 90–68	Minneapolis, Minnesota	X	
Result		ACC		8	3
Winners are in **bold**. Rankings from ESPN Coaches Poll (Nov. 27). Wake Forest did not play.

== Regular season ==
=== Rankings ===
Legend
	Improvement in ranking
	Drop in ranking
	Not ranked previous week
RV	Received votes but were not ranked in Top 25 of poll
(Italics)	Number of first place votes

		Pre/ Wk 1	Wk 2	Wk 3	Wk 4	Wk 5	Wk 6	Wk 7	Wk 8	Wk 9	Wk 10	Wk 11	Wk 12	Wk 13	Wk 14	Wk 15	Wk 16	Wk 17	Wk 18	Wk 19	Final
Illinois	AP	RV	RV	RV	RV	RV		RV	RV											RV	*
Illinois	C	RV	RV	RV	RV	RV	RV	RV	RV	RV								RV		RV	
Indiana	AP	RV	RV	RV							RV	RV	23	RV	RV	24	RV	RV	RV	RV	*
Indiana	C	RV	RV								RV	RV	24	25T	24	19	RV		RV		RV
Iowa	AP																				*
Iowa	C																				
Michigan	AP	RV	RV	RV	RV	RV	RV	RV					RV								*
Michigan	C	RV	RV	RV	RV																
Michigan State	AP			RV	RV	RV	RV	RV	RV	RV			RV	RV	RV			RV	RV	RV	*
Michigan State	C	RV	RV	RV	RV	25	23	25	25	24	RV	RV	RV	RV				RV	RV		RV
Minnesota	AP																				*
Minnesota	C																				
Northwestern	AP																				*
Northwestern	C																				
Ohio State	AP	7	5	4	3 (15)	5	4 (2)	3 (3)	6	6	5	7	5	4	3	2	2 (31)	1 (62)	1 (70)	1 (71)	*
Ohio State	C	4 (1)	4 (1)	3 (1)	1 (11)	4	4 (1)	3 (2)	6	6	5	7	5	4	3	2	1 (17)	1 (29)	1 (30)	1 (30)	2
Penn State	AP																				*
Penn State	C																				
Purdue	AP		RV	RV		RV	RV	RV	RV	RV											*
Purdue	C					RV	RV	RV													
Wisconsin	AP	9	9	7	12	11	7	4	4	4	3 (1)	2 (21)	2 (22)	2 (24)	4	3	1 (35)	4	3	6	*
Wisconsin	C	9	9	7	13	12	7	5	4	4	4	3 (2)	3 (2)	2 (4)	4	3	2 (10)	5	4	7	11T

- AP does not release a post-tournament poll.

== Conference honors ==
Two sets of conference award winners are recognized by the Big Ten – one selected by league coaches and one selected by the media.

Honor	Coaches	Media
Player of the Year	Alando Tucker, Wisconsin	Alando Tucker, Wisconsin
Coach of the Year	Thad Matta, Ohio State	Thad Matta, Ohio State
Freshman of the Year	Greg Oden, Ohio State	Greg Oden, Ohio State
Defensive Player of the Year	Greg Oden, Ohio State	Not Selected
Sixth Man of the Year	Daequan Cook, Ohio State	Not Selected
All-Big Ten first team	Adam Haluska, Iowa	Adam Haluska, Iowa
All-Big Ten first team	Drew Neitzel, Michigan State	Drew Neitzel, Michigan State
All-Big Ten first team	Greg Oden, Ohio State	Mike Conley Jr., Ohio State
All-Big Ten first team	Carl Landry, Purdue	Greg Oden, Ohio State
All-Big Ten first team	Alando Tucker, Wisconsin	Alando Tucker, Wisconsin
All-Big Ten second team	Warren Carter, Illinois	D.J. White, Indiana
All-Big Ten second team	D.J. White, Indiana	Geary Claxton, Penn State
All-Big Ten second team	Mike Conley Jr., Ohio State	Carl Landry, Purdue
All-Big Ten second team	David Teague, Purdue	David Teague, Purdue
All-Big Ten second team	Kammron Taylor, Wisconsin	Kammron Taylor, Wisconsin
All-Big Ten third team	Shawn Pruitt, Illinois	Warren Carter, Illinois
All-Big Ten third team	Roderick Wilmont, Indiana	Shawn Pruitt, Illinois
All-Big Ten third team	Tyler Smith, Iowa	Roderick Wilmont, Indiana
All-Big Ten third team	Dion Harris, Michigan	Tyler Smith, Iowa
All-Big Ten third team	Geary Claxton, Penn State	Dion Harris, Michigan
All Big Ten Honorable Mention	Rich McBride, Illinois	Earl Calloway, Indiana
All Big Ten Honorable Mention	Lawrence McKenzie, Minnesota	Dan Coleman, Minnesota
All Big Ten Honorable Mention	Tim Doyle, Northwestern	Lawrence McKenzie, Minnesota
All Big Ten Honorable Mention	Jamar Butler, Ohio State	Tim Doyle, Northwestern
All Big Ten Honorable Mention	Ron Lewis, Ohio State	Jamar Butler, Ohio State
All Big Ten Honorable Mention	Jamelle Cornley, Penn State	Daequan Cook, Ohio State
All Big Ten Honorable Mention	Brian Butch, Wisconsin	Ron Lewis, Ohio State
All Big Ten Honorable Mention	Not Selected	Jamelle Cornley, Penn State
All Big Ten Honorable Mention	Not Selected	Michael Flowers, Wisconsin
All-Freshman team	Tyler Smith, Iowa	Not Selected
All-Freshman team	Raymar Morgan, Michigan State	Not Selected
All-Freshman team	Kevin Coble, Northwestern	Not Selected
All-Freshman team	Mike Conley Jr., Ohio State	Not Selected
All-Freshman team	Greg Oden, Ohio State	Not Selected
All-Defensive team	Chester Frazier, Illinois	Not Selected
All-Defensive team	Travis Walton, Michigan State	Not Selected
All-Defensive team	Greg Oden, Ohio State	Not Selected
All-Defensive team	Chris Kramer, Purdue	Not Selected
All-Defensive team	Michael Flowers, Wisconsin	Not Selected

== Postseason ==
=== Big Ten tournament ===
==== Bracket ====
Opening round March 8
8	Michigan	49
9	Minnesota	40
7	Michigan State	62
10	Northwestern	57
6	Illinois	66
11	Penn State	60

Quarterfinals; March 9
1	Ohio State	72
8	Michigan	62
4	Iowa	55
5	Purdue	74
2	Wisconsin	70
7	Michigan State	57
3	Indiana	54
6	Illinois	58^{OT}

Semifinals; March 10
1	Ohio State	63
5	Purdue	52
2	Wisconsin	53
6	Illinois	41

Championship; March 11
1	Ohio State	66
2	Wisconsin	49

=== NCAA tournament ===
Team	Bid Type	Seed	Results
Ohio State	Automatic	1	Won First Round vs. No. 16 Central Connecticut State 78–57; Won Second Round vs. No. 9 Xavier 78–71 OT; Won Sweet Sixteen vs. No. 5 Tennessee 85–84; Won Elite Eight vs. No. 2 Memphis 92–76; Won Final Four vs. No. 2 Georgetown 67–60; Lost National Championship vs. No. 1 Florida 75–84
Wisconsin	At-Large	2	Won First Round vs. No. 15 Texas A&M–CC 76–63; Lost Second Round vs. No. 7 UNLV 68–74
Indiana	At-Large	7	Won First Round vs. No. 10 Gonzaga 70–57; Lost Second Round vs. No. 2 UCLA 49–54
Michigan State	At-Large	9	Won First Round vs. No. 8 Marquette 61–49; Lost Second Round vs. No. 1 North Carolina 67–81
Purdue	At-Large	9	Won First Round vs. No. 8 Arizona 72–63; Lost Second Round vs. No. 1 Florida 67–74
Illinois	At-Large	12	Lost First Round vs. No. 5 Virginia Tech 52–54

=== NIT ===
Team	Bid Type	Seed	Results
Michigan	At-large	3	Won vs. No. 6 Utah State; Lost vs. No. 2 Florida State

=== 2007 NBA draft ===
The following Big Ten players were selected in the 2007 NBA draft:

Round	Pick	Player	Position	team	School/club team
1	2	Greg Oden	C	Portland Trail Blazers	Ohio State (Fr.)
1	4	Mike Conley Jr.	PG	Memphis Grizzlies	Ohio State (Fr.)
1	21	Daequan Cook	SG	Philadelphia 76ers	Ohio State (Fr.)
1	29	Alando Tucker	SF	Phoenix Suns	Wisconsin (Sr.)
2	31	Carl Landry	PF	Seattle SuperSonics	Purdue (Sr.)
2	43	Adam Haluska	SG	New Orleans Hornets	Iowa (Sr.)
