= 2006–07 Indiana Hoosiers men's basketball team =

American college basketball season

2006–07 Indiana Hoosiers men's basketball

NCAA tournament, Round of 32
- Conference: Big Ten Conference
- Record: 21–11 (10–6 Big Ten)
- Head coach: Kelvin Sampson (1st season)
- Assistant coaches: Dan Dakich; Rob Senderoff
- Home arena: Assembly Hall

2006–07 Big Ten Conference men's basketball standings
	Conf.				Overall
Team	W		L	PCT	W		L	PCT
No. 1 Ohio State†	15	–	1	.938	35	–	4	.897
No. 6 Wisconsin	13	–	3	.813	30	–	6	.833
Indiana	10	–	6	.625	21	–	11	.656
Iowa	9	–	7	.563	17	–	14	.548
Purdue	9	–	7	.563	22	–	12	.647
Illinois	9	–	7	.563	23	–	12	.657
Michigan State	8	–	8	.500	23	–	12	.657
Michigan	8	–	8	.500	22	–	13	.629
Minnesota	3	–	13	.188	9	–	22	.290
Penn State	2	–	14	.125	13	–	18	.419
Northwestern	2	–	14	.125	11	–	19	.367
† 2007 Big Ten tournament winner As of March 13, 2007; Rankings from AP Poll

The 2006–07 Indiana Hoosiers men's basketball team represented Indiana University in the 2006–07 college basketball season. Their head coach was Kelvin Sampson, in his first season with the Hoosiers. Sampson, formerly at Oklahoma, was hired on March 29, 2006, to replace the recently resigned Mike Davis. The team played its home games at Assembly Hall in Bloomington, Indiana, and was a member of the Big Ten Conference.

The Hoosiers finished the season with an overall record 21–11 and a conference record of 10–6, placing them 3rd in the Big Ten Conference. Indiana lost the only Big Ten tournament game in which they played, an overtime loss to Illinois. As a 7-seed in the NCAA tournament, Indiana beat 10-seed Gonzaga to advance to the second round. They fell to 2-seed UCLA to end the season.

== 2006–07 roster ==
No.	Name	Position	Ht.	Wt.	Year	Hometown/previous school
1	Armon Bassett	G	6–1	176	Fr.	Terre Haute, Indiana / Hargrave Military Academy (Virginia)
3	D.J. White	F	6–9	251	Jr.	Tuscaloosa, Alabama / Hillcrest High School
10	Roderick Wilmont	G	6–4	203	RS Sr.	Miramar, Florida / Miramar High School
11	Errek Suhr	G	5–8	156	Sr.	Bloomington, Indiana / Bloomington High School North
20	A. J. Ratliff	G	6–3	188	Jr.	Indianapolis, Indiana / North Central High School
21	Ben Allen	C	6–11	256	So.	Melbourne, Australia / Australian Institute of Sport
22	Lance Stemler	F	6–8	210	Jr.	Columbia, Illinois / Southwestern Illinois College
30	Mike White	F	6–6	232	Jr.	Springhill, Louisiana / Lee College
32	Joey Shaw	G	6–6	193	RS Fr.	Glendale, Arizona / Deer Valley High School
33	Xavier Keeling	F	6–6	230	Fr.	Huntsville, Alabama / J.O. Johnson High School
34	Adam Ahlfeld	F	6–0	193	Jr.	Indianapolis, Indiana / North Central High School
44	Kyle Taber	F	6–8	220	RS So.	Evansville, Indiana / Evansville Central High School
51	Earl Calloway	G	6–3	173	Sr.	Atlanta, Georgia / Georgia Perimeter College

== Recruiting class ==
College recruiting
Name	Hometown	School	Height	Weight	Commit date
Armon Bassett; PG	Terre Haute, IN	Hargrave Military Academy (VA)	6 ft 1 in (1.85 m)	180 lb (82 kg)	Oct 21, 2005
Armon Bassett; PG	Recruit ratings: Scout: Rivals:				
Xavier Keeling; SG	Huntsville, AL	Johnson	6 ft 6 in (1.98 m)	210 lb (95 kg)	Oct 24, 2005
Xavier Keeling; SG	Recruit ratings: Scout: Rivals:				
Lance Stemler; PF	Belleville, IL	Southwestern Illinois CC	6 ft 8 in (2.03 m)	215 lb (98 kg)	May 2, 2006
Lance Stemler; PF	Recruit ratings: Scout:				
Mike White; PF	Springhill, LA	Lee (Tex.) College	6 ft 6 in (1.98 m)	245 lb (111 kg)	Apr 10, 2006
Mike White; PF	Recruit ratings: No ratings found				
Overall recruit ranking:
Note: In many cases, Scout, Rivals, 247Sports, On3, and ESPN may conflict in their listings of height and weight.; In these cases, the average was taken. ESPN grades are on a 100-point scale.; Sources: "2006 Team Ranking". Rivals.

== Schedule and results ==
Date time, TV	Rank^{#}	Opponent^{#}	Result	Record	Site (attendance) city, state
Regular season
11/13/2006*; 9:00pm, ESPN2		vs. Lafayette; NIT Season Tip-Off (Midwest Region)	W 91–66	1–0	Conseco Fieldhouse (8,037); Indianapolis, IN
11/14/2006*; 9:00pm, ESPN		vs. Butler; NIT Season Tip-Off (Midwest Region)	L 55–60	1–1	Conseco Fieldhouse (9,594); Indianapolis, IN
11/17/2006*; 8:00pm, ESPN3		Indiana State	W 73–66	2–1	Assembly Hall (17,178); Bloomington, IN
11/19/2006*; 2:00pm, ESPN3		Chicago State	W 90–69	3–1	Assembly Hall (17,004); Bloomington, IN
11/28/2006*; 9:00pm, ESPN		at No. 10 Duke; ACC – Big Ten Challenge	L 51–54	3–2	Cameron Indoor Stadium (9,314); Durham, NC
12/2/2006*; 8:00pm, ESPN3		Charlotte	W 74–57	4–2	Assembly Hall (17,167); Bloomington, IN
12/6/2006*; 7:00pm, ESPN3		Western Illinois	W 92–40	5–2	Assembly Hall (16,906); Bloomington, IN
12/9/2006*; 12:00pm, CBS		at Kentucky	L 54–59	5–3	Rupp Arena (24,253); Lexington, KY
12/17/2006*; 8:00pm, ESPN		Southern Illinois	W 57–47	6–3	Assembly Hall (13,029); Bloomington, IN
12/20/2006*; 7:00pm, ESPN3		Western Michigan	W 77–69	7–3	Assembly Hall (12,038); Bloomington, IN
12/22/2006*; 8:00pm, ESPN3		IUPUI	W 86–57	8–3	Conseco Fieldhouse (8,172); Indianapolis, IN
12/30/2006*; 8:00pm, ESPN3		Ball State	W 71–57	9–3	Assembly Hall (15,553); Bloomington, IN
1/2/2007; 8:00pm, ESPN		at No. 6 Ohio State	L 67–74	9–4 (0–1)	Value City Arena (18,813); Columbus, OH
1/7/2007; 4:30pm, CBS		No. 24 Michigan State	W 73–51	10–4 (1–1)	Assembly Hall (17,274); Bloomington, IN
1/10/2007; 7:00pm, ESPNU		Purdue; Rivalry/Crimson and Gold Cup	W 85–58	11–4 (2–1)	Assembly Hall (17,287); Bloomington, IN
1/13/2007; 12:15pm, ESPN3		at Penn State	W 84–74	12–4 (3–1)	Bryce Jordan Center (10,159); University Park, PA
1/16/2007; 7:00 pm, ESPN		Iowa	W 71–64	13–4 (4–1)	Assembly Hall (17,240); Bloomington, IN
1/20/2007*; 3:45pm, CBS		at Connecticut	W 77–73	14–4 (4–1)	XL Center (16,294); Hartford, CT
1/23/2007; 7:30pm, ESPN	No. 24	at Illinois; Rivalry	L 43–51	14–5 (4–2)	Assembly Hall (16,618); Champaign, IL
1/27/2007; 12:00pm, ESPN	No. 24	Michigan	W 76–61	15–5 (5–2)	Assembly Hall (17,285); Bloomington, IN
1/31/2007; 7:00pm, ESPN	No. 25	No. 2 Wisconsin	W 71–66	16–5 (6–2)	Assembly Hall (17,142); Bloomington, IN
2/3/2007; 2:05 pm, ESPN	No. 25	at Iowa	L 75–81	16–6 (6–3)	Carver-Hawkeye Arena (15,500); Iowa City, IA
2/10/2007; 1:00pm, CBS	No. 24	Illinois; Rivalry	W 65–61	17–6 (7–3)	Assembly Hall (17,316); Bloomington, IN
2/15/2007; 7:00pm, ESPN3	No. 19	at Purdue; Rivalry/Crimson and Gold Cup	L 68–81	17–7 (7–4)	Mackey Arena (14,123); West Lafayette, IN
2/17/2007; 4:00pm, ESPN	No. 19	at Michigan	L 55–58	17–8 (7–5)	Crisler Arena (13,751); Ann Arbor, MI
2/21/2007; 7:00 pm, ESPN3		Minnesota	W 71–59	18–8 (8–5)	Assembly Hall (17,228); Bloomington, IN
2/24/2007; 9:00pm, ESPN		at Michigan State	L 58–66	18–9 (8–6)	Breslin Center (14,759); East Lansing, MI
2/28/2007; 8:00pm	No. 22	at Northwestern	W 69–65	19–9 (9–6)	Welsh-Ryan Arena (6,358); Evanston, IL
3/3/2007; 8:00pm, ESPN3		Penn State	W 94–63	20–9 (10–6)	Assembly Hall (17,315); Bloomington, IN
Big Ten tournament
3/9/2007; 9:10pm, ESPN3		vs. Illinois; Quarterfinals	L 54–58 ^{OT}	20–10	United Center (22,081); Chicago, IL
NCAA tournament
3/15/2007*; 9:45pm, CBS		vs. Gonzaga; First Round	W 70–57	21–10	Power Balance Pavilion (16,338); Sacramento, CA
3/17/2007*; 8:10pm, CBS		vs. UCLA; Second Round	L 49–54	21–11	Power Balance Pavilion (16,407); Sacramento, CA
*Non-conference game. ^{#}Rankings from Coaches' Poll. (#) Tournament seedings in parentheses.
