= 2006–07 Illinois Fighting Illini men's basketball team =

American college basketball season

2006–07 Illinois Fighting Illini men's basketball

NCAA men's Division I tournament, Round of 64
- Conference: Big Ten Conference
- Record: 23–12 (9–7 Big Ten)
- Head coach: Bruce Weber (4th season)
- Assistant coaches: Wayne McClain (6th season); Jay Price (4th season); Tracy Webster (3rd season)
- MVPs: Warren Carter; Rich McBride
- Captains: Warren Carter; Rich McBride
- Home arena: Assembly Hall

2006–07 Big Ten Conference men's basketball standings
	Conf.				Overall
Team	W		L	PCT	W		L	PCT
No. 1 Ohio State†	15	–	1	.938	35	–	4	.897
No. 6 Wisconsin	13	–	3	.813	30	–	6	.833
Indiana	10	–	6	.625	21	–	11	.656
Iowa	9	–	7	.563	17	–	14	.548
Purdue	9	–	7	.563	22	–	12	.647
Illinois	9	–	7	.563	23	–	12	.657
Michigan State	8	–	8	.500	23	–	12	.657
Michigan	8	–	8	.500	22	–	13	.629
Minnesota	3	–	13	.188	9	–	22	.290
Penn State	2	–	14	.125	13	–	18	.419
Northwestern	2	–	14	.125	11	–	19	.367
† 2007 Big Ten tournament winner As of March 13, 2007; Rankings from AP Poll

The 2006–07 Illinois Fighting Illini men's basketball team represented University of Illinois at Urbana–Champaign in the 2006–07 NCAA Division I men's basketball season. This was head coach Bruce Weber's fourth season at Illinois. The team finished with 9–7 conference and 21–10 overall records. The Illini advanced to the semifinal round of the Big Ten tournament and were eliminated in the first round of the NCAA tournament.

== Roster ==
2006–07 Illinois Fighting Illini men's basketball team
Players
Coaches

Pos.	#	Name	Height	Weight	Year	Previous school	Hometown
G	1	Trent Meacham	6 ft 2 in (1.88 m)	195 lb (88 kg)	RS So	Centennial High School	Champaign, IL
G	2	Chris Hicks (W)	6 ft 2 in (1.88 m)	195 lb (88 kg)	Jr	Whitney Young High School	Chicago, IL
G	3	Chester Frazier	6 ft 2 in (1.88 m)	195 lb (88 kg)	So	Lake Clifton Eastern High School	Baltimore, MD
G	5	Jeremiah Wise (redshirt)	6 ft 3 in (1.91 m)	185 lb (84 kg)	So	Proviso East High School/Indiana State University	Maywood, IL
C	21	Brian Carlwell	6 ft 11 in (2.11 m)	265 lb (120 kg)	Fr	Proviso East High School	Maywood, IL
F	22	Steve Holdren (W)	6 ft 5 in (1.96 m)	215 lb (98 kg)	So	Centennial High School	Champaign, IL
G	25	Calvin Brock	6 ft 5 in (1.96 m)	200 lb (91 kg)	RS So	Simeon High School	Chicago, IL
G	31	Jamar Smith	6 ft 3 in (1.91 m)	185 lb (84 kg)	So	Richwoods High School	Peoria, IL
G	33	Rich McBride (C)	6 ft 3 in (1.91 m)	205 lb (93 kg)	Sr	Lanphier High School	Springfield, IL
F	34	C.J. Jackson	6 ft 8 in (2.03 m)	265 lb (120 kg)	RS Fr	Tri-County High School	Buena Vista, GA
F	41	Warren Carter (C)	6 ft 8 in (2.03 m)	220 lb (100 kg)	Sr	Lake Highlands High School	Dallas, TX
F	42	Brian Randle	6 ft 8 in (2.03 m)	220 lb (100 kg)	RS Jr	Notre Dame High School	East Peoria, IL
F	44	Marcus Arnold	6 ft 8 in (2.03 m)	245 lb (111 kg)	RS Sr	Morgan Park High School	Chicago, IL
F	50	Richard Semrau (injured) (redshirt)	6 ft 10 in (2.08 m)	240 lb (109 kg)	Fr	Lutheran West High School	Grafton, OH
C	55	Shaun Pruitt	6 ft 10 in (2.08 m)	245 lb (111 kg)	Jr	West Aurora High School	Aurora, IL

Head coach

- Bruce Weber (Wisconsin-Milwaukee)

Assistant coach(es)

- Wayne McClain (Illinois State)
- Jay Price (Kansas)
- Tracy Webster (Wisconsin)

Legend

- (C) Team captain
- (S) Suspended
- (I) Ineligible
- (W) Walk-on
- Injured
- Current redshirt

Roster

== Schedule ==
Date time, TV	Opponent	Result	Record	Site (attendance) city, state
Exhibition
11/1/06*; 7:00 pm	Lewis	W 83–58		Assembly Hall (16,618); Champaign, IL
11/8/06*; 7:00 pm	SIU Edwardsville	W 76–57		Assembly Hall (16,618); Champaign, IL
Non-Conference regular season
11/13/06*; 7:00 pm	Austin Peay	W 80–35	1–0	Assembly Hall (16,618); Champaign, IL
11/15/06*; 7:00 pm	Jackson State	W 76–55	2–0	Assembly Hall (16,618); Champaign, IL
11/17/06*; 7:00 pm, ESPN Plus	Georgia Southern	W 85–50	3–0	Assembly Hall (16,618); Champaign, IL
11/19/06*; 4:00 pm	Florida A&M	W 84–63	4–0	Assembly Hall (16,618); Champaign, IL
11/21/06*; 7:00 pm	Savannah State	W 81–34	5–0	Assembly Hall (16,618); Champaign, IL
11/24/06*; 7:30 pm, WCIA	vs. Miami (OH); Chicago Invitational Challenge	W 51–49	6–0	Sears Centre (7,388); Hoffman Estates, IL
11/25/06*; 7:30 pm, WCIA	vs. Bradley; Chicago Invitational Challenge	W 75–71	7–0	Sears Centre (8,532); Hoffman Estates, IL
11/28/06*; 6:00 pm, ESPN	No. 23 Maryland	L 66–72	7–1	Assembly Hall (16,618); Champaign, IL
12/2/06*; 4:00 pm, ESPN	vs. No. 16 Arizona	L 72–84	7–2	US Airways Center (15,507); Phoenix, AZ
12/6/06*; 7:00 pm, ESPN Plus	IUPUI	W 87–59	8–2	Assembly Hall (16,618); Champaign, IL
12/9/06*; 1:00 pm, ESPN Plus	Illinois–Chicago	W 71–66	9–2	United Center (16,424); Chicago, IL
12/17/06*; 4:00 pm, ESPN Plus	Belmont	W 77–51	10–2	Assembly Hall (16,618); Champaign, IL
12/19/06*; 8:00 pm, ESPN	vs. Missouri; Braggin' Rights	W 73–70	11–2	Scottrade Center (22,153); St. Louis, MO
12/21/06*; 7:00 pm, ESPN Plus	Idaho State	W 71–60	12–2	Assembly Hall (16,618); Champaign, IL
12/29/06*; 8:00 pm, ESPN2	vs. Xavier	L 59–65	12–3	U.S. Bank Arena (13,256); Cincinnati, OH
Big Ten regular season
1/3/07; 7:00 pm, ESPN Plus	at Michigan	L 61–71	12–4 (0–1)	Crisler Arena (11,023); Ann Arbor, MI
1/7/07; 1:00 pm, ESPN	No. 6 Ohio State	L 44–62	12–5 (0–2)	Assembly Hall (16,618); Champaign, IL
1/10/07; 7:00 pm, ESPN Plus	Iowa; Rivalry	W 74–70	13–5 (1–2)	Assembly Hall (16,618); Champaign, IL
1/14/07; 12:30 pm, CBS	at Michigan State	L 57–63	13–6 (1–3)	Breslin Student Events Center (14,759); East Lansing, MI
1/17/07; 6:00 pm, ESPN2	at Minnesota	W 64–52	14–6 (2–3)	Williams Arena (11,020); Minneapolis, MN
1/20/07; 1:00 pm, ESPN	No. 2 Wisconsin	L 64–71	14–7 (2–4)	Assembly Hall (16,618); Champaign, IL
1/23/07; 6:00 pm, ESPN	No. 23 Indiana; Rivalry	W 51–43	15–7 (3–4)	Assembly Hall (16,618); Champaign, IL
1/27/07; 1:30 pm, ESPN Plus	at Purdue	L 47–64	15–8 (3–5)	Mackey Arena (14,123); West Lafayette, IN
1/30/07; 8:00 pm, ESPN	Michigan State	W 57–50	16–8 (4–5)	Assembly Hall (16,618); Champaign, IL
2/3/07; 7:00 pm, ESPN Plus	Minnesota	W 59–49	17–8 (5–5)	Assembly Hall (16,618); Champaign, IL
2/7/07; 6:00 pm, ESPN2	at Northwestern; Rivalry	W 58–43	18–8 (6–5)	Welsh-Ryan Arena (7,129); Evanston, IL
2/10/07; 12:00 pm, CBS	at Indiana; Rivalry	L 61–65	18–9 (6–6)	Assembly Hall (17,316); Bloomington, IN
2/18/07; 2:00 pm, ESPN Plus	Northwestern; Rivalry	W 48–37	19–9 (7–6)	Assembly Hall (16,618); Champaign, IL
2/21/07; 8:00 pm, ESPNU	Michigan	W 54–42	20–9 (8–6)	Assembly Hall (16,618); Champaign, IL
2/24/07; 1:00 pm, ESPN	at Penn State	W 68–50	21–9 (9–6)	Bryce Jordan Center (12,034); State College, PA
3/3/07; 11:00 am, ESPN Plus	at Iowa; Rivalry	L 53–60	21–10 (9–7)	Carver-Hawkeye Arena (15,500); Iowa City, IA
Big Ten tournament
3/8/07; 4:05 pm, ESPN2	vs. (11) Penn State; Opening round	W 66–60	22–10	United Center (16,219); Chicago, IL
3/9/07; 8:10 pm, ESPN Plus	vs. (3) Indiana; Quarterfinals	W 58–54 ^{OT}	23–10	United Center (22,081); Chicago, IL
3/10/07; 3:05 pm, CBS	vs. (2) No. 3 Wisconsin; Semifinals	L 41–53	23–11	United Center (20,471); Chicago, IL
NCAA tournament
3/16/07; 6:00 pm, CBS	vs. (5 W) Virginia Tech; First round	L 52–54	23–12	Nationwide Arena (19,916); Columbus, OH
*Non-conference game. ^{#}Rankings from AP Poll. (#) Tournament seedings in parentheses. All times are in Central Time.

== Season statistics ==
Legend
GP	Games played	GS	Games started	Avg	Average per game
FG	Field-goals made	FGA	Field-goal attempts	Off	Offensive rebounds
Def	Defensive rebounds	A	Assists	TO	Turnovers
Blk	Blocks	Stl	Steals	High	Team high

Individual Player Statistics
			Minutes		Scoring		Total FGs			3-point FGs			Free-Throws			Rebounds							
Player	GP	GS	Tot	Avg	Pts	Avg	FG	FGA	Pct	3FG	3FA	Pct	FT	FTA	Pct	Off	Def	Tot	Avg	A	TO	Blk	Stl
Carter, Warren	34	34	1047	30.8	466	13.7	167	344	.485	31	74	.419	101	142	.711	61	148	209	6.1	68	90	32	24
Pruitt, Shaun	35	35	929	26.5	399	11.4	161	293	.549	0	0	.000	77	150	.513	105	156	261	7.5	7	68	16	10
McBride, Rich	31	27	992	32.0	298	9.6	96	281	.342	82	234	.350	24	35	.686	7	56	63	2.0	71	45	4	20
Frazier, Chester	33	28	1038	31.5	238	7.2	72	203	.355	34	106	.321	60	101	.594	50	100	150	4.5	148	81	6	48
Randle, Brian	24	23	616	25.7	177	7.4	66	133	.496	11	31	.355	34	59	.576	35	84	119	5.0	26	46	11	23
Meacham, Trent	35	12	622	17.8	175	5.0	51	136	.375	35	87	.402	38	48	.792	6	30	36	1.0	60	40	0	19
Brock, Calvin	35	9	671	19.2	174	5.0	72	162	.444	9	30	.300	21	36	.583	58	69	127	3.6	56	40	6	24
Smith, Jamar	21	6	472	22.5	170	8.1	53	159	.333	38	120	.317	26	33	.788	11	23	34	1.6	39	18	3	19
Arnold, Marcus	34	1	317	9.3	69	2.0	28	60	.467	0	0	.000	13	26	.500	17	28	45	1.3	3	22	9	8
Carlwell, Brian	26	0	183	7.0	44	1.7	14	31	.452	0	0	.000	16	31	.516	19	17	36	1.4	3	10	10	8
Semrau, Richard	5	0	63	12.6	18	3.6	4	14	.286	1	5	.200	9	13	.692	6	5	11	2.2	3	6	0	0
Jackson, C.J.	12	0	54	4.5	13	1.1	5	7	.714	0	0	.000	3	3	1.000	6	12	18	1.5	3	5	2	1
Hicks, Chris	12	0	27	2.3	4	0.3	1	7	.143	0	4	.000	2	3	.667	0	1	1	0.1	1	3	0	1
0	0		0	0.0	0	0.0	0	0	.000	0	0	.000	0	0	.000	0	0	0	0.0	0	0	0	0
Team																56	65	121			17		
Total	35		7025		2245	64.1	790	1830	.432	241	691	.349	424	680	.624	437	794	1231	35.2	488	491	99	205
