= 2007 Big Ten men's basketball tournament =

- Classification: Division I
- Season: 2006–07
- Teams: 11
- Site: United Center; Chicago, Illinois
- Champions: Ohio State Buckeyes (1st title)
- Winning coach: Thad Matta (1st title)
- MVP: Greg Oden (Ohio State)

2006–07 Big Ten Conference men's basketball standings
	Conf.				Overall
Team	W		L	PCT	W		L	PCT
No. 1 Ohio State†	15	–	1	.938	35	–	4	.897
No. 6 Wisconsin	13	–	3	.813	30	–	6	.833
Indiana	10	–	6	.625	21	–	11	.656
Iowa	9	–	7	.563	17	–	14	.548
Purdue	9	–	7	.563	22	–	12	.647
Illinois	9	–	7	.563	23	–	12	.657
Michigan State	8	–	8	.500	23	–	12	.657
Michigan	8	–	8	.500	22	–	13	.629
Minnesota	3	–	13	.188	9	–	22	.290
Penn State	2	–	14	.125	13	–	18	.419
Northwestern	2	–	14	.125	11	–	19	.367
† 2007 Big Ten tournament winner As of March 13, 2007; Rankings from AP Poll

The 2007 Big Ten men's basketball tournament was played between March 8 and March 11, 2007 at the United Center in Chicago, Illinois. It was the tenth annual Big Ten men's basketball tournament. The championship was won by Ohio State who defeated Wisconsin in the championship game. As a result, Ohio State received the Big Ten's automatic bid to the NCAA tournament. The win marked Ohio State's first tournament championship (the prior championship has been vacated) in their fourth appearance.

== Seeds ==
All Big Ten schools played in the tournament. Teams were seeded by conference record, with a tiebreaker system used to seed teams with identical conference records. Seeding for the tournament was determined at the close of the regular conference season. The top five teams received a first round bye.

Seed	School	Conference	Tiebreaker 1	Tiebreaker 2	Tiebreaker 3	Tiebreaker 4
1	Ohio State	15–1				
2	Wisconsin	13–3				
3	Indiana	10–6				
4	Iowa	9–7	2–1 vs Pur, Ill			
5	Purdue	9–7	1–1 vs Iowa, Ill			
6	Illinois	9–7	1–2 vs Pur, Iowa			
7	Michigan State	8–8	1–1 vs Mich	0–2 vs OSU	1–1 vs Wisc	
8	Michigan	8–8	1–1 vs MSU	0–2 vs OSU	0–1 vs Wisc	
9	Minnesota	3–13				
10	Northwestern	2–14	1–1 vs PSU	0–2 vs OSU	0–2 vs Wisc	0–1 vs Ind
11	Penn State	2–14	1–1 vs PSU	0–2 vs OSU	0–2 vs Wisc	0–2 vs Ind

== Bracket ==
Opening round March 8
8	Michigan	49
9	Minnesota	40
7	Michigan State	62
10	Northwestern	57
6	Illinois	66
11	Penn State	60

Quarterfinals; March 9
1	Ohio State	72
8	Michigan	62
4	Iowa	55
5	Purdue	74
2	Wisconsin	70
7	Michigan State	57
3	Indiana	54
6	Illinois	58^{OT}

Semifinals; March 10
1	Ohio State	63
5	Purdue	52
2	Wisconsin	53
6	Illinois	41

Championship; March 11
1	Ohio State	66
2	Wisconsin	49

== All-Tournament Team ==
- Greg Oden, Ohio State – Big Ten tournament Most Outstanding Player
- Mike Conley Jr., Ohio State
- Carl Landry, Purdue
- Kammron Taylor, Wisconsin
- Alando Tucker, Wisconsin
