= 2006–07 Iowa Hawkeyes men's basketball team =

American college basketball season

2006–07 Iowa Hawkeyes men's basketball
- Conference: Big Ten Conference
- Record: 17–14 (9–7 Big Ten)
- Head coach: Steve Alford (8th season)
- Associate head coach: Craig Neal
- Assistant coaches: Tim Buckley; Billy Garrett Sr.; Paul Weir
- MVP: Adam Haluska
- Home arena: Carver–Hawkeye Arena (Capacity: 15,500)

2006–07 Big Ten Conference men's basketball standings
	Conf.				Overall
Team	W		L	PCT	W		L	PCT
No. 1 Ohio State†	15	–	1	.938	35	–	4	.897
No. 6 Wisconsin	13	–	3	.813	30	–	6	.833
Indiana	10	–	6	.625	21	–	11	.656
Iowa	9	–	7	.563	17	–	14	.548
Purdue	9	–	7	.563	22	–	12	.647
Illinois	9	–	7	.563	23	–	12	.657
Michigan State	8	–	8	.500	23	–	12	.657
Michigan	8	–	8	.500	22	–	13	.629
Minnesota	3	–	13	.188	9	–	22	.290
Penn State	2	–	14	.125	13	–	18	.419
Northwestern	2	–	14	.125	11	–	19	.367
† 2007 Big Ten tournament winner As of March 13, 2007; Rankings from AP Poll

The 2006–07 Iowa Hawkeyes men's basketball team represented the University of Iowa as members of the Big Ten Conference during the 2006–07 NCAA Division I men's basketball season. The team was led by eighth-year head coach Steve Alford and played their home games at Carver–Hawkeye Arena. The Hawkeyes finished the season 17–14 overall and 9–7 in Big Ten play (tied for fourth place). This marked the first time since the 1976–1977 season that an Iowa men's basketball team with a winning record failed to make either the NCAA tournament or the NIT.

== Roster ==
2006–07 Iowa Hawkeyes men's basketball team
Players
Coaches

Pos.	#	Name	Height	Weight	Year	Hometown
G	1	Adam Haluska	6 ft 5 in (1.96 m)	—	Sr	Carroll, Iowa
F	5	Alex Thompson	6 ft 10 in (2.08 m)	—	Jr	Ames, Iowa
G	11	Tony Freeman	6 ft 1 in (1.85 m)	—	So	Maywood, Illinois
G	14	Brett Wessels	6 ft 2 in (1.88 m)	—	So	Bettendorf, Iowa
F	20	Ryan Kennedy	6 ft 7 in (2.01 m)	—	So	Des Moines, Iowa
G	25	Carlton Reed	6 ft 4 in (1.93 m)	—	Jr	Waterloo, Iowa
F	34	Tyler Smith	6 ft 7 in (2.01 m)	210 lb (95 kg)	Fr	Pulaski, Tennessee
G	35	Mike Henderson	6 ft 2 in (1.88 m)	—	Sr	Waterloo, Iowa
C	53	Seth Gorney	6 ft 11.75 in (2.13 m)	—	Jr	Vandalia, Ohio

Head coach

- Steve Alford (Indiana)

Assistant coach(es)

- Tim Buckley (Bemidji State)

Legend

- (C) Team captain
- (S) Suspended
- (I) Ineligible
- (W) Walk-on
- Injured
- Current redshirt

== Schedule/Results ==
Date time, TV	Rank^{#}	Opponent^{#}	Result	Record	Site city, state
Non-conference regular season
Nov 13, 2006*		The Citadel	W 75–53	1–0	Carver-Hawkeye Arena; Iowa City, IA
Nov 17, 2006*		vs. Toledo; Paradise Jam tournament	W 78–65	2–0	Virgin Islands Sport & Fitness Center; Saint Thomas, U.S. Virgin Islands
Nov 19, 2006*		vs. No. 10 Alabama; Paradise Jam Tournament	L 60–72	2–1	Virgin Islands Sport & Fitness Center; Saint Thomas, U.S. Virgin Islands
Nov 20, 2006*		vs. Villanova; Paradise Jam Tournament, 3rd Place Game	L 60–89	2–2	Virgin Islands Sport & Fitness Center; Saint Thomas, U.S. Virgin Islands
Nov 25, 2006*		at Arizona State	L 64–67	2–3	Wells Fargo Arena; Tempe, AZ
11/29/2006*		at Virginia Tech; ACC–Big Ten Challenge	L 65-69	2-4	Cassell Coliseum; Blacksburg, VA
Dec 1, 2006*		Texas–Rio Grande Valley; Hawkeye Challenge Tournament	W 62–46	3–4	Carver-Hawkeye Arena; Iowa City, IA
Dec 2, 2006*		Coppin State; Hawkeye Challenge Tournament	W 83–67	4–4	Carver-Hawkeye Arena; Iowa City, IA
Dec 5, 2006*		Northern Iowa; Iowa Big Four	L 55–57	4–5	Carver-Hawkeye Arena; Iowa City, IA
12/8/2006*		Iowa State; Rivalry	W 77-59	5-5	Carver-Hawkeye Arena; Iowa City, IA
12/16/2006*		at Drake; Iowa Big Four	L 59-75	5-6	Knapp Center; Des Moines, IA
Dec 20, 2006*		Georgia State	W 101–59	6–6	Carver-Hawkeye Arena; Iowa City, IA
Dec 23, 2006*		Texas Southern	W 90–63	7–6	Carver-Hawkeye Arena; Iowa City, IA
Dec 30, 2006*		Cornell	W 65–50	8–6	Carver-Hawkeye Arena; Iowa City, IA
Big Ten Regular Season
Jan 4, 2007*		Michigan State	W 62–60	9–6 (1–0)	Carver-Hawkeye Arena (11,469); Iowa City, IA
Jan 10, 2007*		at Illinois	L 70–74	9–7 (1–1)	Assembly Hall; Champaign, IL
Jan 13, 2007*		Minnesota	W 60–49	10–7 (2–1)	Carver-Hawkeye Arena; Iowa City, IA
Jan 16, 2007*		at Indiana	L 64–71	10–8 (2–2)	Assembly Hall; Bloomington, IN
Jan 20, 2007*		at No. 7 Ohio State	L 63–82	10–9 (2–3)	Value City Arena; Columbus, OH
Jan 24, 2007*		Penn State	W 79–63	11–9 (3–3)	Carver-Hawkeye Arena; Iowa City, IA
Jan 28, 2007*		No. 2 Wisconsin	L 46–57	11–10 (3–4)	Carver-Hawkeye Arena; Iowa City, IA
Jan 31, 2007*		at Michigan	W 69–62	12–10 (4–4)	Crisler Arena; Ann Arbor, MI
Feb 3, 2007*		Indiana	W 81–75	13–10 (5–4)	Carver-Hawkeye Arena; Iowa City, IA
Feb 7, 2007*		at Minnesota	W 91–78	14–10 (6–4)	Williams Arena; Minneapolis, MN
Feb 10, 2007*		at No. 4 Wisconsin	L 62–74	14–11 (6–5)	Kohl Center; Madison, WI
Feb 15, 2007*		Northwestern	W 66–58	15–11 (7–5)	Carver-Hawkeye Arena; Iowa City, IA
Feb 17, 2007*		at Michigan State	L 49–81	15–12 (7–6)	Breslin Center; East Lansing, MI
Feb 21, 2007*		Purdue	W 78–59	16–12 (8–6)	Carver-Hawkeye Arena; Iowa City, IA
Feb 28, 2007*		at Penn State	L 72–74	16–13 (8–7)	Bryce Jordan Center; University Park, PA
Mar 3, 2007*		Illinois	W 60–53	17–13 (9–7)	Carver-Hawkeye Arena; Iowa City, IA
Big Ten tournament
3/9/2007		vs. Purdue	L 55-74	17-14	United Center; Chicago, IL
*Non-conference game. ^{#}Rankings from AP Poll. (#) Tournament seedings in parentheses.
