= 2006–07 Ohio State Buckeyes men's basketball team =

American college basketball season

2006–07 Ohio State Buckeyes men's basketball

NCAA tournament, Runner-up AP Poll National Champion Big Ten regular season champions Big Ten tournament champions

National Championship Game, L 75–84 vs. Florida
- Conference: Big Ten

Ranking
- Coaches: No. 2
- AP: No. 1
- Record: 35–4 (15–1 Big Ten)
- Head coach: Thad Matta (3rd season)
- Assistant coaches: Alan Major; John Groce; Dan Peters
- Home arena: Value City Arena

2006–07 Big Ten Conference men's basketball standings
	Conf.				Overall
Team	W		L	PCT	W		L	PCT
No. 1 Ohio State†	15	–	1	.938	35	–	4	.897
No. 6 Wisconsin	13	–	3	.813	30	–	6	.833
Indiana	10	–	6	.625	21	–	11	.656
Iowa	9	–	7	.563	17	–	14	.548
Purdue	9	–	7	.563	22	–	12	.647
Illinois	9	–	7	.563	23	–	12	.657
Michigan State	8	–	8	.500	23	–	12	.657
Michigan	8	–	8	.500	22	–	13	.629
Minnesota	3	–	13	.188	9	–	22	.290
Penn State	2	–	14	.125	13	–	18	.419
Northwestern	2	–	14	.125	11	–	19	.367
† 2007 Big Ten tournament winner As of March 13, 2007; Rankings from AP Poll

The 2006–07 Ohio State Buckeyes men's basketball team represented Ohio State University in the 2006–07 NCAA Division I men's basketball season. The team was led by third-year head coach Thad Matta, and played their home games at the Value City Arena, in Columbus, Ohio as members of the Big Ten Conference. They finished the season 35–4, 15–1 in Big Ten play to win the regular season Big Ten championship. As the No. 1 seed in the Big Ten tournament, they defeated Michigan, Purdue, and Wisconsin to win the tournament championship. As a result, the team earned the conference's automatic bid to the NCAA tournament, received the No. 1 seed in the South regional, and was the overall top seed of the tournament. They defeated Central Connecticut State and Matta's former team, Xavier, to advance to the Sweet Sixteen. The Buckeyes then defeated Tennessee and Memphis to advance to the Final Four, their first trip to the Final Four under Matta. With a win over Georgetown, the team advanced to the national championship game against Florida, where they lost 84–75. Of note, the Florida football team also defeated the Buckeyes to win the National Championship in the same year.

== Preseason ==
=== Recruiting ===
College recruiting information
Name	Hometown	School	Height	Weight	Commit date
Mike Conley Jr. PG	Indianapolis, IN	Lawrence North HS	6 ft 1 in (1.85 m)	165 lb (75 kg)	Jun 29, 2005
Mike Conley Jr. PG	Recruit ratings: Scout: Rivals:				
Daequan Cook; SG	Dayton, OH	Dunbar HS	6 ft 5 in (1.96 m)	190 lb (86 kg)	Mar 23, 2005
Daequan Cook; SG	Recruit ratings: Scout: Rivals:				
David Lighty; SF	Cleveland, OH	Villa Angela-St. Joseph HS	6 ft 5 in (1.96 m)	180 lb (82 kg)	Apr 29, 2005
David Lighty; SF	Recruit ratings: Scout: Rivals:				
Greg Oden; C	Indianapolis, IN	Lawrence North HS	7 ft 0 in (2.13 m)	240 lb (110 kg)	Jun 29, 2005
Greg Oden; C	Recruit ratings: Scout: Rivals:				
Junior College/Transfers
Othello Hunter; PF	Winston-Salem, NC	Hillsborough CC	6 ft 9 in (2.06 m)	215 lb (98 kg)	Jul 18, 2007
Othello Hunter; PF	Recruit ratings: Scout: Rivals:				
Overall recruit ranking: Scout: 2 Rivals: 2
Note: In many cases, Scout, Rivals, 247Sports, On3, and ESPN may conflict in their listings of height and weight.; In these cases, the average was taken. ESPN grades are on a 100-point scale.; Sources: "Ohio State 2006 Basketball Commitments". Rivals.; "2006 Ohio State Basketball Commits". Scout.; "Scout.com Team Recruiting Rankings". Scout.; "2006 Team Ranking". Rivals.

== Roster ==
2006–07 Ohio State Buckeyes men's basketball team
Players
Coaches

Pos.	#	Name	Height	Weight	Year	Previous school	Hometown
G	14	Jamar Butler	6 ft 1 in (1.85 m)	195 lb (88 kg)	Jr	Shawnee High School	Lima, OH
G	1	Mike Conley Jr.	6 ft 1 in (1.85 m)	180 lb (82 kg)	Fr	Lawrence North High School	Indianapolis, IN
G	31	Daequan Cook	6 ft 5 in (1.96 m)	210 lb (95 kg)	Fr	Dunbar High School	Dayton, OH
F	3	Ivan Harris	6 ft 7 in (2.01 m)	220 lb (100 kg)	Sr	Oak Hill Academy	Springfield, OH
F	45	Othello Hunter	6 ft 8 in (2.03 m)	225 lb (102 kg)	Jr	R.J. Reynolds HS/Hillsborough CC	Winston-Salem, NC
F	12	Ron Lewis	6 ft 4 in (1.93 m)	200 lb (91 kg)	Sr	Brookhaven HS/Bowling Green State	Columbus, Ohio
G/F	23	David Lighty	6 ft 5 in (1.96 m)	215 lb (98 kg)	Fr	Villa Angela-St. Joseph HS	Cleveland, OH
C	15	Kyle Madsen (I)	6 ft 9 in (2.06 m)	240 lb (109 kg)	RS So	Dublin Coffman High School	Dublin, OH
C	20	Greg Oden	7 ft 0 in (2.13 m)	280 lb (127 kg)	Fr	Lawrence North High School	Indianapolis, IN
G	13	Danny Peters	6 ft 2 in (1.88 m)	170 lb (77 kg)	Fr	New Albany High School	New Albany, OH
F/C	42	Matt Terwilliger	6 ft 9 in (2.06 m)	245 lb (111 kg)	Jr	Troy High School	Troy, OH
G	34	Mark Titus (W)	6 ft 4 in (1.93 m)	210 lb (95 kg)	Fr	Brownsburg High School	Brownsburg, IN

Head coach

- Thad Matta (Butler)

Assistant coach(es)

- Alan Major (Purdue)
- Dan Peters (Kent State)

Strength and conditioning coach(es)

- Dave Richardson (Louisiana–Monroe)

Athletic trainer(s)

- Vince O'Brien (Ohio State)

Legend

- (C) Team captain
- (S) Suspended
- (I) Ineligible
- (W) Walk-on
- Injured
- Current redshirt

Roster
Last update: 2010-04-04

== Schedule and results ==
Date time, TV	Rank^{#}	Opponent^{#}	Result	Record	Site (attendance) city, state
Exhibition
November 1*; 1:00 pm	No. 4	Findlay	W 80–57		Value City Arena; Columbus, OH
November 5*; 1:00 pm	No. 4	Walsh	W 87–62		Value City Arena; Columbus, OH
Regular season
November 10*; 8:00 pm	No. 4	VMI; BCA Classic	W 107–69	1–0	Value City Arena (13,219); Columbus, OH
November 11*; 8:00 pm	No. 4	Loyola (IL); BCA Classic	W 87–75	2–0	Value City Arena (13,269); Columbus, OH
November 12*; 8:00 pm	No. 4	Kent State; BCA Classic	W 81–59	3–0	Value City Arena (12,883); Columbus, OH
November 17*; 7:00 pm	No. 4	Eastern Kentucky	W 74–45	4–0	Value City Arena (18,882); Columbus, OH
November 20*; 8:00 pm	No. 3	San Francisco	W 82–60	5–0	Value City Arena (14,592); Columbus, OH
November 24*; 8:00 pm	No. 3	vs. Youngstown State	W 91–57	6–0	Nationwide Arena (17,463); Columbus, OH
November 29*; 9:00 pm	No. 1	at No. 6 North Carolina; ACC–Big Ten Challenge	L 89–98	6–1	Dean Smith Center (21,750); Chapel Hill, NC
December 2*; 4:00 pm	No. 1	Valparaiso	W 78–58	7–1	Value City Arena (17,311); Columbus, OH
December 9*; 2:00 pm	No. 4	Cleveland State	W 78–57	8–1	Value City Arena (17,158); Columbus, OH
December 16*; 3:56 pm	No. 4	vs. Cincinnati; John R. Wooden Tradition	W 72–50	9–1	Conseco Fieldhouse (18,356); Indianapolis, IN
December 19*; 8:00 pm	No. 3	Iowa State	W 75–56	10–1	Value City Arena (18,905); Columbus, OH
December 23*; 4:00 pm	No. 3	at No. 4 Florida	L 60–86	10–2	O'Connell Center (12,621); Gainesville, FL
December 30*; 8:00 pm	No. 6	Coppin State	W 91–54	11–2	Value City Arena (18,943); Columbus, OH
January 2; 8:00 pm	No. 6	Indiana	W 74–67	12–2 (1–0)	Value City Arena (18,813); Columbus, OH
January 6; 1:00 pm	No. 6	at Illinois	W 62–44	13–2 (2–0)	Assembly Hall (16,618); Champaign, IL
January 9; 8:05 pm	No. 5	at No. 4 Wisconsin	L 69–72	13–3 (2–1)	Kohl Center (17,190); Madison, WI
January 13*; 1:00 pm	No. 5	No. 20 Tennessee	W 68–66	14–3	Value City Arena (18,817); Columbus, OH
January 17; 8:00 pm	No. 7	Northwestern	W 73–41	15–3 (3–1)	Value City Arena (18,903); Columbus, OH
January 20; 8:00 pm	No. 7	Iowa	W 82–63	16–3 (4–1)	Value City Arena (18,963); Columbus, OH
January 24; 7:00 pm	No. 5	at Northwestern	W 59–50	17–3 (5–1)	Welsh-Ryan Arena (6,646); Evanston, IL
January 27; 9:00 pm	No. 5	Michigan State; ESPN College GameDay	W 66–64	18–3 (6–1)	Value City Arena (18,965); Columbus, OH
January 31; 7:00 pm	No. 4	at Purdue	W 78–60	19–3 (7–1)	Mackey Arena (13,961); West Lafayette, IN
February 3; 4:00 pm	No. 4	at Michigan State	W 63–54	20–3 (8–1)	Breslin Center (14,759); East Lansing, MI
February 6; 7:00 pm	No. 3	Michigan	W 76–63	21–3 (9–1)	Value City Arena (18,927); Columbus, OH
February 10; 12:15 pm	No. 3	Purdue	W 63–56	22–3 (10–1)	Value City Arena (18,988); Columbus, OH
February 14; 7:00 pm	No. 2	at Penn State	W 64–62	23–3 (11–1)	Bryce Jordan Center (10,027); University Park, PA
February 18; 12:00 pm	No. 2	at Minnesota	W 85–67	24–3 (12–1)	Williams Arena (13,026); Minneapolis, MN
February 21; 8:00 pm	No. 1	Penn State	W 68–60	25–3 (13–1)	Value City Arena (18,957); Columbus, OH
February 25; 4:00 pm	No. 1	No. 2 Wisconsin	W 49–48	26–3 (14–1)	Value City Arena (19,044); Columbus, OH
March 3; 4:00 pm	No. 1	at Michigan	W 65–61	27–3 (15–1)	Crisler Arena (13,751); Ann Arbor, MI
Big Ten tournament
March 9; 11:00 am	(1) No. 1	(8) Michigan; Quarterfinals	W 72–62	28–3	United Center (18,103); Chicago, IL
March 10; 12:40 pm	(1) No. 1	(5) Purdue; Semifinals	W 63–52 ^{CBS}	29–3	United Center (20,471); Chicago, IL
March 11; 2:30 pm, CBS	(1) No. 1	(2) No. 4 Wisconsin; Championship	W 66–49	30–3	United Center (17,538); Chicago, IL
NCAA tournament
March 15; 7:10 pm, CBS	(1 S) No. 1	vs. (16 S) Central Connecticut State; First Round	W 78–57	31–3	Rupp Arena (20,752); Lexington, KY
March 17; 1:10 pm, CBS	(1 S) No. 1	vs. (9 S) Xavier; Second Round	W 78–71 ^{OT}	32–3	Rupp Arena (20,882); Lexington, KY
March 22; 9:18 pm, CBS	(1 S) No. 1	vs. (5 S) Tennessee; Sweet Sixteen	W 85–84	33–3	Alamodome (26,776); San Antonio, TX
March 24; 3:40 pm, CBS	(1 S) No. 1	vs. (2 S) No. 5 Memphis; Elite Eight	W 92–76	34–3	Alamodome (26,260); San Antonio, TX
March 31; 6:07 pm, CBS	(1 S) No. 1	vs. (2 E) No. 8 Georgetown; Final Four	W 67–60	35–3	Georgia Dome (53,510); Atlanta, GA
April 2; 9:21 pm, CBS	(1 S) No. 1	vs. (1 MW) No. 3 Florida; National Championship Game	L 75–84	35–4	Georgia Dome (51,458); Atlanta, GA
*Non-conference game. ^{#}Rankings from Coaches' Poll. (#) Tournament seedings in parentheses. All times are in Eastern Time.

== Rankings ==
Ranking movements Legend: ██ Increase in ranking ██ Decrease in ranking ( ) = First-place votes
	Week																			
Poll	Pre	1	2	3	4	5	6	7	8	9	10	11	12	13	14	15	16	17	18	Final
AP	7	5	4	3 (15)	5	4 (2)	3 (3)	6	6	5	7	5	4	3	2	2 (31)	1 (62)	1 (70)	1 (71)	Not released
Coaches	4 (1)	4 (1)	3 (1)	1 (11)	4	4 (1)	3 (2)	6	6	5	7	5	4	3	2	1 (17)	1 (29)	1 (30)	1	2

*AP does not release post-NCAA tournament rankings.
