= 2006–07 Purdue Boilermakers men's basketball team =

American college basketball season

2006–07 Purdue Boilermakers men's basketball

NCAA tournament, Round of 32
- Conference: Big Ten Conference
- Record: 22–12 (9–7 Big Ten)
- Head coach: Matt Painter (2nd season)
- Assistant coaches: Cuonzo Martin (7th season); Paul Lusk (3rd season); Rick Ray (1st season)
- Home arena: Mackey Arena

2006–07 Big Ten Conference men's basketball standings
	Conf.				Overall
Team	W		L	PCT	W		L	PCT
No. 1 Ohio State†	15	–	1	.938	35	–	4	.897
No. 6 Wisconsin	13	–	3	.813	30	–	6	.833
Indiana	10	–	6	.625	21	–	11	.656
Iowa	9	–	7	.563	17	–	14	.548
Purdue	9	–	7	.563	22	–	12	.647
Illinois	9	–	7	.563	23	–	12	.657
Michigan State	8	–	8	.500	23	–	12	.657
Michigan	8	–	8	.500	22	–	13	.629
Minnesota	3	–	13	.188	9	–	22	.290
Penn State	2	–	14	.125	13	–	18	.419
Northwestern	2	–	14	.125	11	–	19	.367
† 2007 Big Ten tournament winner As of March 13, 2007; Rankings from AP Poll

The 2006–07 Purdue Boilermakers men's basketball team represented Purdue University during the 2006-07 NCAA Division I men's basketball season.

== Roster ==
2006–07 Purdue Boilermakers men's basketball team
Players
Coaches

Pos.	#	Name	Height	Weight	Year	Hometown
G	2	David Teague	6 ft 5 in (1.96 m)	196 lb (89 kg)	Sr	Indianapolis, IN
G	3	Chris Kramer	6 ft 3 in (1.91 m)	214 lb (97 kg)	Fr	Huntington, IN
G	5	Keaton Grant	6 ft 4 in (1.93 m)	201 lb (91 kg)	Fr	Kissimmee, FL
G	11	Bobby Riddell	5 ft 9 in (1.75 m)	169 lb (77 kg)	So	Lafayette, IN
G	12	Tarrance Crump	6 ft 1 in (1.85 m)	176 lb (80 kg)	Jr	Decatur, AL
G	14	Chris Lutz	6 ft 3 in (1.91 m)	190 lb (86 kg)	So	Bedford, NH
F	14	Carl Landry	6 ft 9 in (2.06 m)	248 lb (112 kg)	Sr	Milwaukee, WI
G	20	Marcus Green	6 ft 6 in (1.98 m)	224 lb (102 kg)	So	Franklin Park, IL
F	21	Gordon Watt	6 ft 6 in (1.98 m)	225 lb (102 kg)	So	Evanston, IL
F	30	Johnathan Uchendu	6 ft 11 in (2.11 m)	205 lb (93 kg)	Fr	Pulaski County, AR
G	31	Chris Hartley	6 ft 4 in (1.93 m)	198 lb (90 kg)	Sr	Noblesville, IN
C	34	Dan Vandervieren	6 ft 10 in (2.08 m)	265 lb (120 kg)	Fr	Eden Prairie, MN
	43	A.J. Graft	6 ft 2 in (1.88 m)	213 lb (97 kg)	Fr	Granger, IN

Head coach

Matt Painter (Purdue)

Assistant coach(es)

Cuonzo Martin (Purdue)
Paul Lusk (Southern Illinois)
Rick Ray (Grand View)

Legend

- (C) Team captain
- (S) Suspended
- (I) Ineligible
- (W) Walk-on
- Injured
- Current redshirt

Roster
Last update: 2022-11-02

== Schedule ==
Date time, TV	Rank^{#}	Opponent^{#}	Result	Record	Site city, state
November 3*		North Dakota; Exhibition	W 92–60	—	Mackey Arena; West Lafayette, IN
November 8*		Wisconsin-Platteville; Exhibition	W 78–46	—	Mackey Arena; West Lafayette, IN
November 13*		Northern Colorado	W 90–58	1–0	Mackey Arena; West Lafayette, IN
November 17*		Western Carolina	W 82–57	2–0	Mackey Arena; West Lafayette, IN
November 20*; 5:00 p.m.		vs. No. 23 Georgia Tech; Maui Invitational	L 61–79	2–1	Lahaina, HI
November 21*		vs. Oklahoma; Maui Invitational	W 74–71	3–1	Lahaina, HI
November 22*		vs. DePaul; Maui Invitational	W 81–73	4–1	Lahaina, HI
November 29		No. 25 Virginia; ACC-Big Ten Challenge	W 61–59	5–1	Mackey Arena; West Lafayette, IN
December 2*		Delaware State	W 62–40	6–1	Mackey Arena; West Lafayette, IN
December 5		Loyola (IL)	W 78–62	7–1	Mackey Arena; West Lafayette, IN
December 9*; 2:00 p.m.		Missouri	W 79–62	8–1	Mackey Arena (13,505); West Lafayette, IN
December 16*		vs. No. 18 Butler; Wooden Tradition	L 65–68	8–2	Conseco Fieldhouse; Indianapolis, IN
December 19*		Wagner	W 95–56	9–2	Mackey Arena; West Lafayette, IN
December 22*		Texas A&M-Corpus Christi	W 79–61	10–2	Mackey Arena; West Lafayette, IN
December 28*		at Indiana State	L 70–89	10–3	Hulman Center; Terre Haute, IN
December 30*		Southeast Missouri State	W 102–65	11–3	Mackey Arena; West Lafayette, IN
January 3		at Minnesota	L 59–65	11–4 (0–1)	Minneapolis, MN
January 6		Penn State	W 64–60	12–4 (1–1)	Mackey Arena; West Lafayette, IN
January 10		at Indiana; Rivalry	L 58–85	12–5 (1–2)	Bloomington, IN
January 13		Michigan	W 67–53	13–5 (2–2)	Mackey Arena; West Lafayette, IN
January 17		at No. 2 Wisconsin	L 64–69	13–6 (2–3)	Madison, WI
January 20		at Michigan	L 55–71	13–7 (2–4)	Ann Arbor, MI
January 27		Illinois	W 64–47	14–7 (3–4)	Mackey Arena; West Lafayette, IN
January 31		No. 4 Ohio State	L 60–78	14–8 (3–5)	Mackey Arena; West Lafayette, IN
February 3		at Penn State	W 69–59	15–8 (4–5)	University Park, PA
February 7		Michigan State	W 62–38	16–8 (5–5)	Mackey Arena; West Lafayette, IN
February 10		at No. 3 Ohio State	L 56–63	16–9 (5–6)	Columbus, OH
February 15		No. 24 Indiana	W 81–68	17–9 (6–6)	Mackey Arena; West Lafayette, IN
February 21		at Iowa	L 59–78	17–10 (6–7)	Iowa City, IA
February 24		at Northwestern	W 75–68	18–10 (7–7)	Evanston, IL
February 28		Minnesota	W 66–47	19–10 (8–7)	Mackey Arena; West Lafayette, IN
March 3		Northwestern	W 73–50	20–10 (9–7)	Mackey Arena; West Lafayette, IN
March 9*	(5)	vs. (4) Iowa; Big Ten tournament	W 74–55	21–10	United Center; Chicago, IL
March 10*	(5)	vs. (1) Ohio State; Big Ten tournament	L 52–63	21–11	United Center; Chicago, IL
March 16*	(9 MW)	vs. (8 MW) Arizona; First Round	W 72–63	22–11	New Orleans, LA
March 18*	(9 MW)	vs. (1 MW) No. 3 Florida; Second Round	L 67–74	22–12	New Orleans, LA
*Non-conference game. ^{#}Rankings from AP Poll. (#) Tournament seedings in parentheses. MW=Midwest.
