= 2006–07 Minnesota Golden Gophers men's basketball team =

American college basketball season

2006–07 Minnesota Golden Gophers men's basketball
- Conference: Big Ten Conference
- Record: 9–22 (3–13 Big Ten)
- Head coach: Dan Monson/Jim Molinari
- Assistant coach: Niko Medved
- Home arena: Williams Arena

2006–07 Big Ten Conference men's basketball standings
	Conf.				Overall
Team	W		L	PCT	W		L	PCT
No. 1 Ohio State†	15	–	1	.938	35	–	4	.897
No. 6 Wisconsin	13	–	3	.813	30	–	6	.833
Indiana	10	–	6	.625	21	–	11	.656
Iowa	9	–	7	.563	17	–	14	.548
Purdue	9	–	7	.563	22	–	12	.647
Illinois	9	–	7	.563	23	–	12	.657
Michigan State	8	–	8	.500	23	–	12	.657
Michigan	8	–	8	.500	22	–	13	.629
Minnesota	3	–	13	.188	9	–	22	.290
Penn State	2	–	14	.125	13	–	18	.419
Northwestern	2	–	14	.125	11	–	19	.367
† 2007 Big Ten tournament winner As of March 13, 2007; Rankings from AP Poll

The 2006–07 Minnesota Golden Gophers men's basketball team represented the University of Minnesota in the college basketball season of 2006–2007. The team's head coach, Dan Monson, began his eighth season with the Gophers only to resign after a 2 win, 5 loss start. Assistant coach Jim Molinari took over for the remainder of the season on an interim basis. The Golden Gophers played their home games at Williams Arena in Minneapolis, Minnesota and are members of the Big Ten Conference.

== Season ==
Coming off of a short NIT run at the end of the previous season, the Gophers, with no seniors on the roster, began 2006 in a slump. After losing 4 straight games, the final 3 at the inaugural Old Spice Classic in Orlando to take last place, the Gophers were beaten badly at home by Clemson on November 29. Head coach Dan Monson announced the next day that he would resign from his coaching duties, stating, "It's time for somebody else to make the next step and that's to have more success on the court than I had." Assistant coach Jim Molinari was appointed as interim head coach, but the Gophers could never quite get their season started, finishing with a disappointing 9 wins and 22 losses.

== Roster ==
#	Name	Height	Weight (lbs.)	Position	Class	Hometown	Previous Team(s)
1	Lawrence McKenzie	6'2"	180	G	RJr.	Minneapolis, MN, U.S.	Minneapolis Henry HS; Oklahoma
2	Ryan Saunders	6'1"	180	G	Jr.	Medina, MN, U.S.	Wayzata HS
3	Kevin Payton	6'5"	200	G/F	RFr.	Camden, NJ, U.S.	Camden HS
4	Travis Busch	6'4"	220	G/F	So.	Mounds View, MN, U.S.	Mounds View HS; Cal Poly
5	Limar Wilson	5'11"	160	G	Jr.	Orlando, FL, U.S.	Lyman HS; NE CC
12	Engen Nurumbi	6'7"	230	F	Jr.	Kinshasa, DR Congo	Arizona Western
13	Dan Coleman	6'9"	225	F	RJr.	Minneapolis, MN, U.S.	Hopkins HS
20	Lawrence Westbrook	6'0"	190	G	Fr.	Chandler, AZ, U.S.	Winchendon Prep
23	Brandon Smith	6'6"	205	G/F	So.	Minneapolis, MN, U.S.	Minneapolis Henry HS
30	Jon Williams	6'9"	285	F	RSo.	St. Cloud, MN, U.S.	St. Cloud Apollo HS; Notre Dame Prep (MA)
33	Jamal Abu-Shamala	6'5"	200	G	So.	Shakopee, MN, U.S.	Shakopee HS
34	Damian Johnson	6'7"	192	F	RFr.	Thibodaux, LA, U.S.	Thibodaux HS
50	Spencer Tollackson	6'9"	267	C	Jr.	Chaska, MN, U.S.	Chaska HS
54	Bryce Webster	6'9"	240	F/C	Fr.	St. Paul, MN, U.S.	St. Thomas Academy

== 2006–07 Schedule and results ==
Date time, TV	Rank^{#}	Opponent^{#}	Result	Record	Site city, state
Exhibition
November 3, 2006*; 7 p.m., no		Bemidji State	W 88–32		Williams Arena; Minneapolis, MN
November 8, 2006*; 7 p.m., no		Winona State	L 69–64		Williams Arena; Minneapolis, MN
Regular Season
November 13, 2006*; 7 p.m., ESPN Plus/FSN North		North Dakota State	W 63–49	1–0	Williams Arena; Minneapolis, MN
November 17, 2006*; 7 p.m., no		Long Island	W 70–54	2–0	Williams Arena; Minneapolis, MN
November 21, 2006*; 7 p.m., ESPN Plus/FSN North		Iowa State	L 68–63	2–1	Williams Arena; Minneapolis, MN
November 23, 2006*; 1 p.m., ESPN2		vs. Marist; Old Spice Classic – Quarterfinal	L 63–56	2–2	HP Field House; Orlando, FL
November 24, 2006*; 11:30 a.m., ESPN2		vs. Southern Illinois; Old Spice Classic – Consolation round	L 69–53	2–3	HP Field House; Orlando, FL
November 26, 2006* no, ESPNU		vs. Montana; Old Spice Classic – 7th place	L 72–65	2–4	HP Field House; Orlando, FL
November 29, 2006*; 8:30 p.m., ESPN2		Clemson; ACC – Big Ten Challenge	L 90–68	2–5	Williams Arena; Minneapolis, MN
December 2, 2006*; 1 p.m., ESPN Plus/FSN North		Arizona State	W 66–63	3–5	Williams Arena; Minneapolis, MN
December 5, 2006*; 7 p.m., no		at Alabama–Birmingham	L 88–81 ^{2OT}	3–6	Bartow Arena; Birmingham, AL
December 7, 2006*; 1 p.m., no		South Dakota State	W 77–53	4–6	Williams Arena; Minneapolis, MN
December 9, 2006*; 1 p.m., ESPN Plus/FSN North		Arkansas–Little Rock	L 67–66	4–7	William's Arena; Minneapolis, MN
December 12, 2006*; 7 p.m., no		Central Florida	W 74–63	5–7	William's Arena; Minneapolis, MN
December 22, 2006*; 9 p.m., ESPN Plus/Mtn network		at UNLV	L 62–58	5–8	Thomas & Mack Center; Paradise, NV
December 30, 2006* no, no		SE Louisiana	W 63–61	6–8	Williams Arena; Minneapolis, MN
Big Ten Regular Season
January 3, 2007; 7 p.m., ESPN Plus/KSTC-45		Purdue	W 65–59	7–8 (1–0)	Williams Arena; Minneapolis, MN
January 6, 2007; 3:37 p.m., ESPN Plus/KSTC-45		at No. 4 Wisconsin	L 68–45	7–9 (1–1)	Kohl Center; Madison, WI
January 13, 2007; 3:37 p.m., ESPN Plus/KSTC-45		at Iowa	L 60–49	7–10 (1–2)	Carver–Hawkeye Arena; Iowa City, IA
January 17, 2007; 6 p.m., ESPN2		Illinois	L 64–52	7–11 (1–3)	Williams Arena; Minneapolis, MN
January 20, 2007; 1:30 p.m., ESPN Plus/KSTC-45		Northwestern	L 55–40	7–12 (1–4)	Williams Arena; Minneapolis, MN
January 24, 2007; 6 p.m., ESPN Plus/FSN North		at No. 6 Michigan State	L 70–46	7–13 (1–5)	Breslin Center; East Lansing, MI
January 27, 2007; 11:15 a.m., ESPN Plus/KSTC-45		Penn State	W 65–60	8–13 (2–5)	Williams Arena; Minneapolis, MN
January 31, 2007; 7 p.m., ESPN Plus/KSTC-45		at Northwestern	W 62–55	9–13 (3–5)	Welsh-Ryan Arena; Evanston, IL
February 3, 2007; 7 p.m., ESPN Plus/FSN North Tape-Delay		at Illinois	L 59–49	9–14 (3–6)	Assembly Hall; Champaign, IL
February 7, 2007; 7 p.m., ESPN Plus/FSN North		Iowa	L 91–78	9–15 (3–7)	Williams Arena; Minneapolis, MN
February 10, 2007; 7 p.m., ESPN Plus/FSN North		at Michigan	L 82–80	9–16 (3–8)	Crisler Arena; Ann Arbor, MI
February 14, 2007; 7 p.m., ESPN Plus/FSN North Tape-Delay		No. 3 Wisconsin	L 75–62	9–17 (3–9)	Williams Arena; Minneapolis, MN
February 18, 2007; 12 p.m., CBS		No. 2 Ohio State	L 85–67	9–18 (3–10)	Williams Arena; Minneapolis, MN
February 21, 2007; 6 p.m., ESPN Plus/KSTC-45		at Indiana	L 71–59	9–19 (3–11)	Assembly Hall; Bloomington, IN
February 24, 2007; 1:32 p.m., ESPN Plus/KSTC-45		Michigan	L 62–51	9–20 (3–12)	Williams Arena; Minneapolis, MN
February 28, 2007; 8 p.m., ESPN Plus/FSN North		at Purdue	L 66–47	9–21 (3–13)	Mackey Arena; West Lafayette, IN
2007 Big Ten tournament
March 8, 2007; 11 a.m., ESPN2	(9)	vs. (8) Michigan; First Round	L 49–40	9–22	Conseco Fieldhouse; Indianapolis, IN
*Non-conference game. ^{#}Rankings from AP Poll. (#) Tournament seedings in parentheses.

== Rankings ==
The 2006–07 Minnesota Golden Gophers basketball team was not ranked during the season.
