= 2006–07 Michigan Wolverines men's basketball team =

American college basketball season

2006–07 Michigan Wolverines men's basketball

NIT, Second Round
- Conference: Big Ten Conference
- Record: 22–13 (8–8 Big Ten)
- Head coach: Tommy Amaker (6th season)
- Assistant coaches: Mike Jackson; Andrew Moore; Dave Pilipovich
- MVP: Dion Harris
- Captain: Lester Abram

2006–07 Big Ten Conference men's basketball standings
	Conf.				Overall
Team	W		L	PCT	W		L	PCT
No. 1 Ohio State†	15	–	1	.938	35	–	4	.897
No. 6 Wisconsin	13	–	3	.813	30	–	6	.833
Indiana	10	–	6	.625	21	–	11	.656
Iowa	9	–	7	.563	17	–	14	.548
Purdue	9	–	7	.563	22	–	12	.647
Illinois	9	–	7	.563	23	–	12	.657
Michigan State	8	–	8	.500	23	–	12	.657
Michigan	8	–	8	.500	22	–	13	.629
Minnesota	3	–	13	.188	9	–	22	.290
Penn State	2	–	14	.125	13	–	18	.419
Northwestern	2	–	14	.125	11	–	19	.367
† 2007 Big Ten tournament winner As of March 13, 2007; Rankings from AP Poll

The 2006-07 Michigan Wolverines men's basketball team represented the University of Michigan in intercollegiate college basketball during the 2006-07 season. The team played its home games in the Crisler Arena in Ann Arbor, Michigan, and was a member of the Big Ten Conference. Under the direction of head coach Tommy Amaker, the team finished tied for seventh in the Big Ten Conference. The team earned an eighth seed and advanced to the quarterfinals of the 2007 Big Ten Conference men's basketball tournament. The team earned an invitation to the 2007 National Invitation Tournament. The team was unranked for all eighteen weeks of Associated Press Top Twenty-Five Poll, and it also ended the season unranked in the final USA Today/CNN Poll. The team had a 1–5 record against ranked opponents, with its lone victory coming against #24 Indiana 58–55 on February 17, 2007 at Crisler Arena.

Lester Abram served as team captains, and Dion Harris earned team MVP honors. The team's leading scorers were Harris (469 points), Courtney Sims (401 points) and Abram (319 points). The leading rebounders were Sims (218), Brent Petway (205) and Ekpe Udoh (139).

Harris won the Big Ten Conference free throw percentage statistical championship with an 87.3% average in conference games.

In the 2007 Big Ten Conference men's basketball tournament at the United Center from March 8–11, Michigan was seeded eighth. In the first round, they defeated number 9 Minnesota 49–40 before losing to number 1 Ohio State 72–62 in the second round.

On March 13, 2007, Michigan defeated six seeded Utah State 68–58 at Crisler Arena in the first round of the 2007 National Invitation Tournament. Then Michigan lost to two-seeded Florida State 87–66 at the Donald L. Tucker Center in Tallahassee in the second round. Amaker was fired as head coach on March 17.

== Team Players Drafted into the NBA ==
Year	Round	Pick	Player	NBA Club
2010	1	6	Ekpe Udoh*	Golden State Warriors

*Transferred to Baylor Bears basketball before being drafted

== Schedule and results ==
https://mgoblue.com/sports/mens-basketball/schedule/2006-07

== See also ==
- Michigan Wolverines men's basketball
- 2007 National Invitation Tournament
- NIT all-time team records
- NIT bids by school and conference
- NIT championships and semifinal appearances
