= 2006–07 Wisconsin Badgers men's basketball team =

American college basketball season

2006–07 Wisconsin Badgers men's basketball

NCAA tournament, Round of 32
- Conference: Big Ten Conference

Ranking
- Coaches: No. 11 (tied)
- AP: No. 6
- Record: 30–6 (13–3 Big Ten)
- Head coach: Bo Ryan
- Assistant coaches: Greg Gard; Gary Close; Howard Moore
- Home arena: Kohl Center

2006–07 Big Ten Conference men's basketball standings
	Conf.				Overall
Team	W		L	PCT	W		L	PCT
No. 1 Ohio State†	15	–	1	.938	35	–	4	.897
No. 6 Wisconsin	13	–	3	.813	30	–	6	.833
Indiana	10	–	6	.625	21	–	11	.656
Iowa	9	–	7	.563	17	–	14	.548
Purdue	9	–	7	.563	22	–	12	.647
Illinois	9	–	7	.563	23	–	12	.657
Michigan State	8	–	8	.500	23	–	12	.657
Michigan	8	–	8	.500	22	–	13	.629
Minnesota	3	–	13	.188	9	–	22	.290
Penn State	2	–	14	.125	13	–	18	.419
Northwestern	2	–	14	.125	11	–	19	.367
† 2007 Big Ten tournament winner As of March 13, 2007; Rankings from AP Poll

The 2006–07 Wisconsin Badgers men's basketball team represented the University of Wisconsin–Madison in the 2006–07 NCAA Division I men's basketball season. The head coach was Bo Ryan, coaching his sixth season with the Badgers. The team played their home games at the Kohl Center in Madison, Wisconsin as a member of the Big Ten Conference. The Badgers finished the season 30–6, 13–3 in Big Ten play to finish in second place. They lost in the Big Ten tournament championship to Ohio State. They received an at-large bid to the NCAA tournament as a No. 2 seed in the Midwest Region. In the First Round, they defeated Texas A&M–Corpus Christi before being upset by No. 7-seeded UNLV in the Second Round.

== Season Notes ==
Alando Tucker was a senior and won Big Ten Player of the Year in voting by both the coaches and the media. He averaged 19.9 point per game. He was a 1st team consensus All-American, and was a Wooden Award finalist but the award went to a freshman from Texas, Kevin Durant. Kammron Taylor was also a senior. Brian Butch, Greg Stiemsma, and Michael Flowers were juniors.

The season was a promising one as Wisconsin beat then-ranked #2 Pittsburgh in December, and then-ranked #5 Ohio State in January. Wisconsin earned its first ever #1 AP ranking in school history on February 20, 2007. However, the Badgers lost that same evening at Michigan State. An important rematch with Ohio State loomed a few days later on Sunday, February 25, 2007 in Columbus. The Buckeyes, boasting an elite freshman class led by Mike Conley and Greg Oden, edged the Badgers, 49-48. In that game, junior center Brian Butch severely injured his elbow and missed the rest of Wisconsin's season.

Losing Butch was a large blow to Wisconsin, who despite making it to the Big Ten championship game, still limped into March Madness as a 2-seed. The team struggled to close out 15-seed Texas A&M-Corpus Christi in the first round before getting ousted by 7-seed UNLV in the second round. Meanwhile, Ohio State advanced to the NCAA Tournament finale before falling to Florida, which repeated as champion.

== Awards ==
All-Big Ten by Media

- Alando Tucker - 1st team (unanimous)
- Kammron Taylor - 2nd team
- Michael Flowers - Honorable mention

All-Big Ten by Coaches

- Alando Tucker - 1st team (unanimous)
- Kammron Taylor - 2nd team
- Brian Butch - Honorable mention
- Michael Flowers - All-Defensive team

== Previous season ==
The Badgers finished the 2005–06 season 19–12, 9–7 in Big Ten play to finish in tie for fourth place. They lost to Indiana in the quarterfinals of the Big Ten tournament. The Badgers received an at-large bid to the NCAA tournament as a No. 9 seed in the Minneapolis region. They lost in the First Round to No. 8-seeded Arizona.

== Roster ==
No.	Name	Position	Ht.	Wt.	Year	Hometown/High School
12	Jason Bohannon	G	6–2	195	FR	Marion, Iowa / Linn-Mar HS
14	Tanner Bronson	G	5–11	160	JR	Glendale, Wisconsin / Nicolet HS
32	Brian Butch	F	6–11	245	JR	Appleton, Wisconsin / West HS
21	Morris Cain	G	6–5	210	SO	Glendale, Wisconsin / Nicolet HS
5	Jason Chappell	F/C	6–10	245	SR	New Berlin, Wisconsin / New Berlin West HS / Worcester Academy
22	Michael Flowers	G	6–2	185	JR	Madison, Wisconsin / La Follette HS
44	J.P. Gavinski	C	6–11	245	FR	Wisconsin Dells, Wisconsin / Wisconsin Dells HS
43	Kevin Gullikson	F	6–7	240	SO	Stillwater, Minnesota / Stillwater Sr. HS
3	Trevon Hughes	G	6–1	190	FR	Queens, New York / St. John's NW Academy
45	Joe Krabbenhoft	F/G	6–7	217	SO	Sioux Falls, South Dakota / Roosevelt HS
1	Marcus Landry	F	6–7	230	SO	Milwaukee, Wisconsin / Vincent HS
34	Greg Stiemsma	C	6–11	260	JR	Randolph, Wisconsin / Randolph HS
23	Kammron Taylor	G	6–2	175	SR	Minneapolis, Minnesota / North HS
42	Alando Tucker	F	6–6	205	SR	Lockport, Illinois / Lockport Township HS
15	Brett Valentyn	G	6–4	180	FR	Verona, Wisconsin / Verona HS

== Schedule ==
Date time, TV	Rank^{#}	Opponent^{#}	Result	Record	High points	High rebounds	High assists	Site (attendance) city, state
Non-conference regular season
11/12/2006*; 4:00 pm	No. 9	Mercer	W 72–48	1–0	22 – Taylor (1)	10 – Krabbenhoft (1)	3 – Bohannon (1), Flowers (1), Krabbenhoft (1), Taylor (1)	Kohl Center (17,190); Madison, WI
11/15/2006*; 7:00 pm, ESPN+	No. 9	UW-Green Bay	W 79–62	2–0	18 – Tucker (1)	6 – Krabbenhoft (2)	5 – Flowers (2)	Kohl Center (17,190); Madison, WI
11/19/2006*; 4:00 pm	No. 9	Southern; South Padre Invitational	W 92–39	3–0	16 – Tucker (2)	6 – Butch (1)	3 – Flowers (3), Bohannon (2)	Kohl Center (17,190); Madison, WI
11/21/2006*; 7:00 pm	No. 7	Delaware State; South Padre Invitational	W 64–52	4–0	25 – Tucker (3)	10 – Butch (2)	3 – Flowers (4), Krabbenhoft (2)	Kohl Center (17,190); Madison, WI
11/24/2007*; 11:00 am, CSTV	No. 7	vs. Missouri State; South Padre Invitational	L 64–66	4–1	26 – Tucker (4)	9 – Tucker (1)	6 – Flowers (5)	South Padre Island Convention Centre (1,300); South Padre Island, TX
11/25/2006*; 12:00 pm	No. 7	vs. Auburn	W 77–63	5–1	16 – Taylor (2)	8 – Krabbenhoft (3)	4 – Krabbenhoft (3), Tucker (1)	South Padre Island Convention Centre (1,300); South Padre Island, TX
11/28/2006*; 6:30 pm	No. 12	Florida State; ACC-Big Ten Challenge	W 81–66	6–1	22 – Tucker (5)	6 – Krabbenhoft (4)	3 – Flowers (6), Chappell (1), Stiemsma (1)	Kohl Center (17,190); Madison, WI
12/2/2006*; 1:00 pm	No. 12	Florida International	W 79–63	7–1	16 – Taylor (3)	6 – Landry (1)	5 – Flowers (7), Stiemsma (2)	Kohl Center (17,190); Madison, WI
12/4/2006*; 7:00 pm	No. 12	Winthrop	W 82–79 ^{OT}	8–1	21 – Tucker (6), Flowers (1)	9 – Butch (3)	5 – Flowers (8)	Kohl Center (17,190); Madison, WI
12/9/2006*; 1:00 pm, ESPN	No. 11	at No. 17 Marquette	W 70–66	9–1	28 – Tucker (7)	7 – Krabbenhoft (5)	4 – Taylor (2)	Bradley Center (19,020); Milwaukee, WI
12/13/2006*; 7:00 pm	No. 7	UW-Milwaukee	W 68–49	10–1	20 – Tucker (8)	8 – Butch (4)	2 – Bohannon (3), Tucker (2)	Kohl Center (17,190); Madison, WI
12/16/2006*; 11:00 am	No. 7	No. 2 Pittsburgh	W 89–75	11–1	32 – Tucker (9)	11 – Butch (5)	3 – Chappell (2), Butch (1)	Kohl Center (17,190); Madison, WI
12/23/2006*; 7:00 pm	No. 4	Pacific	W 83–47	12–1	17 – Taylor (4)	6 – Butch (6), Stiemsma (1)	3 – Flowers (9), Tucker (3)	Kohl Center (17,190); Madison, WI
12/27/2006*; 7:00 pm	No. 4	Gardner-Webb	W 98–40	13–1	17 – Butch (1)	12 – Butch (7)	5 – Tucker (4), Taylor (3)	Kohl Center (17,190); Madison, WI
12/31/2006*; 12:00 pm	No. 4	at Georgia	W 64–54	14–1	29 – Tucker (10)	8 – Tucker (2)	3 – Flowers (10), Krabbenhoft (4), Taylor (4), Butch (2)	Stegeman Coliseum (9,804); Athens, GA
Big Ten regular season
1/6/2007; 3:30 pm	No. 4	Minnesota	W 68–45	15–1 (1–0)	14 – Tucker (11)	9 – Chappell (1)	4 – Flowers (11)	Kohl Center (17,190); Madison, WI
1/9/2007; 8:00 pm	No. 3	No. 5 Ohio State	W 72–69	16–1 (2–0)	25 – Taylor (5)	9 – Krabbenhoft (6)	4 – Tucker (5)	Kohl Center (17,190); Madison, WI
1/13/2007; 1:30 pm	No. 3	at Northwestern	W 56–50	17–1 (3–0)	17 – Tucker (12)	8 – Tucker (3)	2 – Flowers (12)	Welsh-Ryan Arena (7,839); Evanston, IL
1/17/2007; 7:00 pm	No. 2	Purdue	W 69–64	18–1 (4–0)	15 – Flowers (1)	8 – Chappell (2)	4 – Chappell (3)	Kohl Center (17,190); Madison, WI
1/20/2007; 1:00 pm	No. 2	at Illinois	W 71–64	19–1 (5–0)	20 – Taylor (6)	8 – Tucker (4)	3 – Flowers (13)	Assembly Hall (16,618); Champaign, IL
1/24/2007; 8:00 pm	No. 2	Michigan	W 71–58	20–1 (6–0)	16 – Tucker (13), Butch (2)	5 – Krabbenhoft (7)	4 – Taylor (5)	Kohl Center (17,190); Madison, WI
1/28/2007; 12:00 pm	No. 2	at Iowa	W 57–46	21–1 (7–0)	27 – Tucker (14)	14 – Butch (8)	5 – Taylor (6)	Carver-Hawkeye Arena (15,500); Iowa City, IA
1/31/2007; 6:00 pm	No. 2	at Indiana	L 66–71	21–2 (7–1)	23 – Tucker (15)	8 – Butch (9)	4 – Taylor (7)	Assembly Hall (17,283); Bloomington, IN
2/3/2007; 1:00 pm	No. 2	Northwestern	W 69–52	22–2 (8–1)	20 – Tucker (16)	9 – Tucker (5)	4 – Flowers (14), Taylor (8)	Kohl Center (17,190); Madison, WI
2/7/2007; 7:00 pm	No. 4	at Penn State	W 71–58	23–2 (9–1)	24 – Tucker (17)	8 – Tucker (6)	6 – Flowers (15)	Bryce Jordan Center (7,615); University Park, PA
2/10/2007; 1:00 pm	No. 4	Iowa	W 74–62	24–2 (10–1)	21 – Tucker (18)	8 – Krabbenhoft (8)	3 – Krabbenhoft (5)	Kohl Center (17,190); Madison, WI
2/14/2007; 7:00 pm	No. 3	at Minnesota	W 75–62	25–2 (11–1)	29 – Tucker (19)	9 – Tucker (7)	4 – Krabbenhoft (6)	Williams Arena (13,820); Minneapolis, MN
2/17/2007; 11:00 am	No. 3	Penn State	W 75–49	26–2 (12–1)	22 – Tucker (20)	6 – Tucker (8)	5 – Stiemsma (3)	Kohl Center (17,190); Madison, WI
2/20/2007; 6:00 pm	No. 1	at Michigan State	L 55–64	26–3 (12–2)	18 – Landry (1)	5 – Krabbenhoft (9), Landry (2), Flowers (1)	4 – Flowers (16), Krabbenhoft (7)	Breslin Center (14,759); East Lansing, MI
2/25/2007; 3:00 pm, CBS	No. 1	at No. 2 Ohio State	L 48–49	26–4 (12–3)	12 – Tucker (21)	8 – Tucker (9)	3 – Hughes (1)	Value City Arena (19,044); Columbus, OH
3/3/2007; 11:00 am	No. 4	Michigan State	W 52–50	27–4 (13–3)	26 – Tucker (22)	5 – Flowers (2)	2 – Tucker (6)	Kohl Center (17,190); Madison, WI
Big Ten tournament
3/9/2007; 5:40 pm	(2) No. 3	vs. (7) Michigan State; Quarterfinals	W 70–57	28–4	21 – Tucker (23)	6 – Tucker (10), Flowers (3)	4 – Taylor (9), Tucker (7)	United Center (22,081); Chicago, IL
3/10/2007; 3:00 pm, CBS	(2) No. 3	vs. (6) Illinois; Semifinals	W 53–41	29–4	21 – Tucker (24)	6 – Krabbenhoft (10)	3 – Flowers (17), Krabbenhoft (8), Landry (1)	United Center (20,471); Chicago, IL
3/11/2007; 2:30 pm, CBS	(2) No. 3	vs. (1) No. 1 Ohio State; Championship	L 49–66	29–5	15 – Taylor (7)	8 – Tucker (11)	4 – Tucker (8)	United Center (17,538); Chicago, IL
NCAA tournament
3/16/2007*; 2:00 pm, CBS	(2 MW) No. 6	vs. (15 MW) Texas A&M–CC; First Round	W 76–63	30–5	24 – Taylor (8)	7 – Landry (3)	3 – Taylor (10), Bohannon (4), Stiemsma (4)	United Center (18,237); Chicago, IL
3/18/2007*; 1:30 pm, CBS	(2 MW) No. 6	vs. (7 MW) No. 19 UNLV; Second Round	L 68–74	30–6	24 – Taylor (9)	7 – Tucker (12)	3 – Flowers (18), Tucker (9)	United Center (20,916); Chicago, IL
*Non-conference game. ^{#}Rankings from AP Poll. (#) Tournament seedings in parentheses.
