= 2006–07 Michigan State Spartans men's basketball team =

American college basketball season

2006–07 Michigan State Spartans men's basketball

NCAA tournament, second round
- Conference: Big Ten Conference
- Record: 23–12 (8–8 Big Ten)
- Head coach: Tom Izzo (12th season)
- Assistant coaches: Mark Montgomery (6th season); Dwayne Stephens (4th season); Jim Boylen (2nd season)
- Captains: Drew Neitzel; Travis Walton
- Home arena: Breslin Center

2006–07 Big Ten Conference men's basketball standings
	Conf.				Overall
Team	W		L	PCT	W		L	PCT
No. 1 Ohio State†	15	–	1	.938	35	–	4	.897
No. 6 Wisconsin	13	–	3	.813	30	–	6	.833
Indiana	10	–	6	.625	21	–	11	.656
Iowa	9	–	7	.563	17	–	14	.548
Purdue	9	–	7	.563	22	–	12	.647
Illinois	9	–	7	.563	23	–	12	.657
Michigan State	8	–	8	.500	23	–	12	.657
Michigan	8	–	8	.500	22	–	13	.629
Minnesota	3	–	13	.188	9	–	22	.290
Penn State	2	–	14	.125	13	–	18	.419
Northwestern	2	–	14	.125	11	–	19	.367
† 2007 Big Ten tournament winner As of March 13, 2007; Rankings from AP Poll

The 2006–07 Michigan State Spartans men's basketball team represented Michigan State University in the 2006–07 NCAA Division I men's basketball season. The head coach was Tom Izzo, who was in his 12th year. The team played home games at the Breslin Center in East Lansing, Michigan. MSU finished the season 23–12, 8–8 in Big Ten play to finish in a tie for seventh place. The Spartans received their tenth consecutive bid to the NCAA tournament, where they lost in the second round to North Carolina.

== Previous season ==
The Spartans finished the 2005–06 season 22–12, 8–8 in Big Ten play, to finish in sixth place. Michigan State received an at-large bid as a No. 6 seed to the NCAA tournament, their ninth straight trip to the tournament, and lost in the first round.

The Spartans lost seniors Paul Davis (17.5 points and 9.1 rebounds per game), Maurice Ager (19.3 points per game) and junior Shannon Brown (17.2 points per game) to the NBA draft following the season.

== Season summary ==
MSU was led by junior Drew Neitzel (18.1 points and 4.3 assist per game) and freshman Raymar Morgan (11.7 points and 5.2 rebounds per game).

=== Non-conference ===
MSU started the season well, with wins over Brown, Youngstown State, and The Citidel in East Lansing. The Spartans then participated in the Coaches vs. Cancer Classic held at Madison Square Garden, where they edged out No. 19 Texas in the semifinals on a Drew Neitzel last-second basket. In the championship game, the Spartans lost on a controversial no-call of a shot clock violation allowing Maryland to maintain their lead and hold off the Spartans 62–59. Wins over Vermont and Oakland at Breslin Center led to a loss at Boston College in the ACC–Big Ten Challenge. MSU closed the non-conference schedule strong, winning their last seven games. However, the Spartans finished the non-conference slate 1–2 in their only trips outside the state of Michigan in the non-conference schedule. MSU finished the non-conference schedule with a record of 13–2, but was not ranked in the polls.

=== Big Ten play ===
Following back-to-back losses to open the Big Ten season the prior year, the Spartans again suffered back-to-losses to open the season, this time on the road to Iowa and Indiana. The remaining Big Ten season was a roller coaster with a four-game winning streak immediately followed by a four-game losing streak and losses to Ohio State (ranked No. 4 and No. 5). A win against No. 1 Wisconsin highlighted the Big Ten season and likely assured the Spartans a trip to the NCAA Tournament. The Spartans finished 8–8 in the conference, finishing in a tie for seventh place. MSU lost to Wisconsin after beating Northwestern in the Big Ten tournament.

=== NCAA Tournament ===
Helped by the win over No. 1 Wisconsin, the Spartans received an at-large bid to the NCAA tournament for the 10th consecutive year, receiving a No. 9 seed, their lowest seed since 2002. A victory over Marquette, coached by former Izzo assistant Tom Crean, in the first round of the tournament was followed by a loss to No. 3 North Carolina in the second round.

== Roster ==
2006–07 Michigan State Spartans men's basketball team
Players
Coaches

Pos.	#	Name	Height	Weight	Year	Previous school	Hometown
		Deon Curry	—	—	Fr
G	22	Isaiah Dahlman	6 ft 6 in (1.98 m)	185 lb (84 kg)	Fr	Braham Area H.S.	Braham, Minnesota
G	1	Brandon Darnton	5 ft 10 in (1.78 m)	170 lb (77 kg)	Jr	Harbor Springs	Harbor Springs, Michigan
G	15	DeMarcus Ducre	5 ft 10 in (1.78 m)	170 lb (77 kg)	RS Jr	Saginaw H.S.	Saginaw, Michigan
PF	41	Marquise Gray	6 ft 8 in (2.03 m)	235 lb (107 kg)	RS So	Beecher H.S.	Flint, Michigan
F	43	Jacob Hannon	6 ft 5 in (1.96 m)	235 lb (107 kg)	RS Jr	Cody H.S.	Cody, Wyoming
C	40	Tom Herzog	7 ft 0 in (2.13 m)	230 lb (104 kg)	Fr	Powers H.S.	Flint, Michigan
C	00	Idong Ibok	6 ft 11 in (2.11 m)	225 lb (102 kg)	RS So	Montverde Academy	Montverde, Florida
G	23	Maurice Joseph	6 ft 4 in (1.93 m)	190 lb (86 kg)	So	Champlain School	Saint-Lambert, Quebec
F	2	Raymar Morgan	6 ft 7 in (2.01 m)	220 lb (100 kg)	Fr	McKinley H.S.	Canton, Ohio
C	34	Drew Naymick	6 ft 10 in (2.08 m)	245 lb (111 kg)	RS Jr	North Muskegon H.S.	North Muskegon, Michigan
PG	11	Drew Neitzel	6 ft 0 in (1.83 m)	180 lb (82 kg)	Jr	Wyoming Park H.S.	Wyoming, Michigan
C	14	Goran Suton	6 ft 10 in (2.08 m)	245 lb (111 kg)	RS So	Everett H.S.	Lansing, Michigan
G	10	Bryan Tibaldi	6 ft 2 in (1.88 m)	180 lb (82 kg)	RS Jr	West H.S.	Traverse City, Michigan
G	5	Travis Walton	6 ft 2 in (1.88 m)	195 lb (88 kg)	RS So	Lima H.S.	Lima, Ohio

Head coach

- Tom Izzo (Northern Michigan)

Assistant coach(es)

- Mark Montgomery (Michigan State)
- Dwayne Stephens (Michigan State)
- Jim Boylen (Maine)

Legend

- (C) Team captain
- (S) Suspended
- (I) Ineligible
- (W) Walk-on
- Injured
- Current redshirt

Roster
Last update: 2016-07-11

== Schedule and results ==
Date time, TV	Rank^{#}	Opponent^{#}	Result	Record	High points	High rebounds	High assists	Site (attendance) city, state
Exhibition
Nov 1, 2006; 7:00 pm		vs. Grand Valley State	W 61–57		–	–	–	Van Andel Arena; Grand Rapids, MI
Nov 5, 2006; 2:00 pm		Northern Michigan	W 74–63		–	–	–	Breslin Center; East Lansing, MI
Non-conference regular season
Nov 8, 2006*; 7:00 pm, ESPNU		Brown; 2K Sports Hoops Classic	W 45–34	1–0	12 – Joseph	6 – Morgan	2 – 4 Tied	Breslin Center (14,759); East Lansing, MI
Nov 9, 2006*; 7:30 pm		Youngstown State; 2K Sports Hoops Classic	W 86–61	2–0	14 – Neitzel	12 – Suton	7 – Walton	Breslin Center (14,759); East Lansing, MI
Nov 12, 2006*; 5:00 pm, ESPN Plus		The Citadel	W 73–41	3–0	17 – Neitzel	8 – Gray	5 – Neitzel	Breslin Center (14,759); East Lansing, MI
Nov 16, 2006*; 9:30 pm, ESPN2		vs. No. 19 Texas; 2K Sports Hoops Classic semifinals	W 63–61	4–0	18 – Morgan	7 – Tied	6 – Neitzel	Madison Square Garden (8,103); New York, NY
Nov 17, 2006*; 9:30 pm, ESPN2		vs. Maryland; 2K Sports Hoops Classic finals	L 60–62	4–1	–	–	–	Madison Square Garden (7,398); New York, NY
Nov 21, 2006*; 7:00 pm		Vermont	W 66–46	5–1	26 – Neitzel	8 – Neitzel	6 – Walton	Breslin Center (14,759); East Lansing, MI
Nov 25, 2006*; 2:00 pm		Oakland	W 71–53	6–1	21 – Neitzel	12 – Gray	7 – Neitzel	Breslin Center (14,759); East Lansing, MI
Nov 29, 2006*; 7:00 pm, ESPN		at Boston College; ACC/Big Ten Challenge	L 58–65	6–2	18 – Suton	9 – Suton	4 – Tied	Conte Forum (8,606); Chestnut Hill, MA
Dec 3, 2006*; 12:00 pm, ESPN Plus		Bradley	W 82–53	7–2	20 – Neitzel	8 – Naymick	9 – Walton	Breslin Center (14,759); East Lansing, MI
Dec 6, 2006*; 7:00 pm		IPFW	W 80–43	8–2	13 – 3 Tied	8 – Tied	7 – Walton	Breslin Center (14,759); East Lansing, MI
Dec 9, 2006*; 3:00 pm, ESPN2		vs. BYU; Spartan Clash	W 76–61	9–2	22 – Neitzel	11 – Suton	7 – Tied	Palace of Auburn Hills (11,187); Auburn Hills, MI
Dec 16, 2006*; 7:00 pm, ESPN Plus		Chicago State	W 69–61	10–2	32 – Neitzel	11 – Gray	5 – Suton	Breslin Center (14,759); East Lansing, MI
Dec 19, 2006*; 7:00 pm		Belmont	W 67–58	11–2	–	–	–	Breslin Center (14,759); East Lansing, MI
Dec 23, 2006*; 12:00 pm, ESPN Plus		Green Bay	W 76–64	12–2	22 – Neitzel	15 – Suton	8 – Walton	Breslin Center (14,759); East Lansing, MI
Dec 30, 2006*; 12:00 pm, ESPN Plus		Loyola (MD)	W 74–61	13–2	27 – Suton	11 – Gray	12 – Neitzel	Breslin Center (14,759); East Lansing, MI
Big Ten regular season
Jan 4, 2007; 9:00 pm, ESPN2		at Iowa	L 60–62	13–3 (0–1)	20 – Neitzel	9 – Suton	6 – Walton	Carver–Hawkeye Arena (11,469); Iowa City, IA
Jan 7, 2007; 4:30 pm, CBS		at Indiana	L 51–73	13–4 (0–2)	12 – Walton	6 – Ibok	3 – Tied	Assembly Hall (17,274); Bloomington, IN
Jan 10, 2007; 8:00 pm, ESPN Plus		Northwestern	W 66–45	14–4 (1–2)	18 – Neitzel	6 – Naymick	5 – Neitzel	Breslin Center (14,759); East Lansing, MI
Jan 14, 2007; 1:30 pm, CBS		Illinois	W 63–57	15–4 (2–2)	19 – Neitzel	6 – Suton	4 – Walton	Breslin Center (14,759); East Lansing, MI
Jan 20, 2007; 4:30 pm, ESPN Plus		at Penn State	W 91–64	16–4 (3–2)	28 – Neitzel	8 – Morgan	7 – Walton	Bryce Jordan Center (13,347); University Park, PA
Jan 24, 2007; 7:00 pm, ESPNU		Minnesota	W 70–46	17–4 (4–2)	14 – Morgan	9 – Gray	11 – Walton	Breslin Center (14,759); East Lansing, MI
Jan 27, 2007; 9:00 pm, ESPN2		at No. 5 Ohio State; ESPN College GameDay	L 64–66	17–5 (4–3)	29 – Neitzel	8 – suton	5 – Walton	Value City Arena (18,965); Columbus, OH
Jan 30, 2007; 9:00 pm, ESPN		at Illinois	L 50–57	17–6 (4–4)	13 – Walton	6 – Tied	5 – Walton	Assembly Hall (16,618); Champaign, IL
Feb 3, 2007; 4:00 pm, CBS		No. 4 Ohio State	L 54–63	17–7 (4–5)	24 – Neitzel	10 – Suton	6 – Neitzel	Breslin Center (14,759); East Lansing, MI
Feb 7, 2007; 8:00 pm, ESPN Plus		at Purdue	L 38–62	17–8 (4–6)	9 – Morgan	6 – Suton	4 – Suton	Mackey Arena (11,830); West Lafayette, IN
Feb 13, 2007; 9:00 pm, ESPN		Michigan; Rivalry	W 59–44	18–8 (5–6)	21 – Neitzel	7 – Naymick	5 – Tied	Breslin Center (14,759); East Lansing, MI
Feb 17, 2007; 2:30 pm, ESPN Plus		Iowa	W 81–49	19–8 (6–6)	17 – Neitzel	8 – Suton	10 – Walton	Breslin Center (14,759); East Lansing, MI
Feb 20, 2007; 7:00 pm, ESPN		No. 1 Wisconsin	W 64–55	20–8 (7–6)	28 – Neitzel	8 – Tied	10 – Walton	Breslin Center (14,759); East Lansing, MI
Feb 24, 2007; 9:00 pm, ESPN		Indiana; ESPN College GameDay	W 66–58	21–8 (8–6)	18 – Morgan	8 – Morgan	6 – Walton	Breslin Center (14,759); East Lansing, MI
Feb 27, 2007; 9:00 pm, ESPN		at Michigan; Rivalry	L 56–67	21–9 (8–7)	13 – Mortan	10 – Suton	5 – Walton	Crisler Arena (13,751); Ann Arbor, MI
Mar 3, 2007; 12:00 pm, ESPN		at No. 4 Wisconsin	L 50–52	21–10 (8–8)	22 – Neitzel	7 – Suton	5 – Walton	Kohl Center (17,190); Madison, WI
Big Ten tournament
Mar 8, 2007; 2:30 pm, ESPN2	(7)	vs. (10) Northwestern opening round	W 62–57	22–10	20 – Neitzel	10 – Suton	6 – Neitzel	United Center (16,219); Chicago, IL
Mar 9, 2007; 6:40 pm, ESPN Plus	(7)	vs. (2) No. 3 Wisconsin quarterfinals	L 57–70	22–11	14 – Suton	8 – Suton	8 – Neitzel	United Center (22,081); Chicago, IL
NCAA tournament
Mar 15, 2007; 7:20 pm, CBS	(9 E)	vs. (8 E) No. 20 Marquette; First Round	W 61–49	23–11	14 – Morgan	9 – Morgan	5 – Tied	Joel Coliseum (14,148); Winston-Salem, NC
Mar 17, 2007; 8:13 pm, CBS	(9 E)	vs. (1 E) No. 4 North Carolina; Second Round	L 67–81	23–12	26 – Neitzel	8 – Suton	5 – Tied	Joel Coliseum (14,148); Winston-Salem, NC
*Non-conference game. ^{#}Rankings from AP Poll. (#) Tournament seedings in parentheses. All times are in Eastern Time Source..

== Player statistics ==
Individual player statistics (final)
		Scoring		Total FGs			3-point FGs			Free-throws			Rebounds				
Player	GP	Pts	Avg	FG	FGA	Pct	3FG	3FA	Pct	FT	FTA	Pct	Tot	Avg	A	Stl	Blk
Curry, Deon	9	1	0.1	0	0		0	0		1	2	.500	3	0.3	1	1	0
Dahlman, Isaiah	26	96	3.7	31	73	.425	6	20	.300	28	37	.757	47	1.8	30	7	4
Darnton, Brandon	13	6	0.5	2	3	.667	1	2	.500	1	3	.333	0	0.0	2	1	0
Ducre, DeMarcus	23	18	0.8	5	16	.313	0	7	.000	1	3	.333	18	0.8	7	2	0
Gray, Marquise	35	238	6.8	96	166	.578	0	0		46	78	.590	191	5.5	19	20	22
Hannon, Jake	19	13	0.7	6	11	.545	0	0		1	4	.250	5	0.3	3	1	0
Ibok, Idong	34	67	2.0	25	37	.676	0	0		17	33	.515	77	2.3	4	5	33
Joseph, Maurice	31	183	5.9	58	153	.379	42	116	.362	25	35	.714	52	1.7	22	7	0
Morgan, Raymar	28	327	11.7	121	249	.486	5	16	.313	80	116	.690	145	5.2	24	19	13
Naymick, Drew	35	129	3.7	47	98	.480	0	0		35	46	.761	136	3.9	18	22	55
Neitzel, Drew	35	635	18.1	199	467	.426	114	277	.412	123	140	.879	99	2.8	151	29	9
Suton, Goran	35	327	9.3	137	269	.509	0	5	.000	53	82	.646	235	6.7	85	23	26
Tibaldi, Bryan	15	7	0.5	3	9	.333	1	4	.250	0	2	.000	3	0.2	1	1	0
Walton, Travis	35	224	6.4	74	164	.451	13	39	.333	63	81	.778	91	2.6	191	42	0
Wardius, Chris	8	5	0.6	2	3	.667	0	0		1	2	.500	1	0.1	2	0	0

Legend
GP	Games played	Avg	Average per game
FG	Field-goals made	FGA	Field-goal attempts
Blk	Blocks	Stl	Steals	A	Assists

== Rankings ==
Ranking movements Legend: ██ Increase in ranking ██ Decrease in ranking — = Not ranked RV = Received votes
	Week																		
Poll	Pre	1	2	3	4	5	6	7	8	9	10	11	12	13	14	15	16	17	Final
AP	—	—	RV	RV	RV	RV	RV	RV	RV	—	—	RV	RV	RV	—	—	RV	RV	RV
Coaches	RV	RV	RV	RV	25	23	25	25	24	RV	RV	RV	RV	RV	—	—	RV	RV	—

*AP does not release post-NCAA Tournament rankings.

== Awards and honors ==
- Drew Neitzel – All-Big Ten First Team
- Drew Neitzel – USBWA All-District Team
- Travis Walton – Big Ten All-Defensive Team
- Drew Neitzel – AP All-American Honorable Mention
