= D. J. White =

American professional basketball player (born 1986)

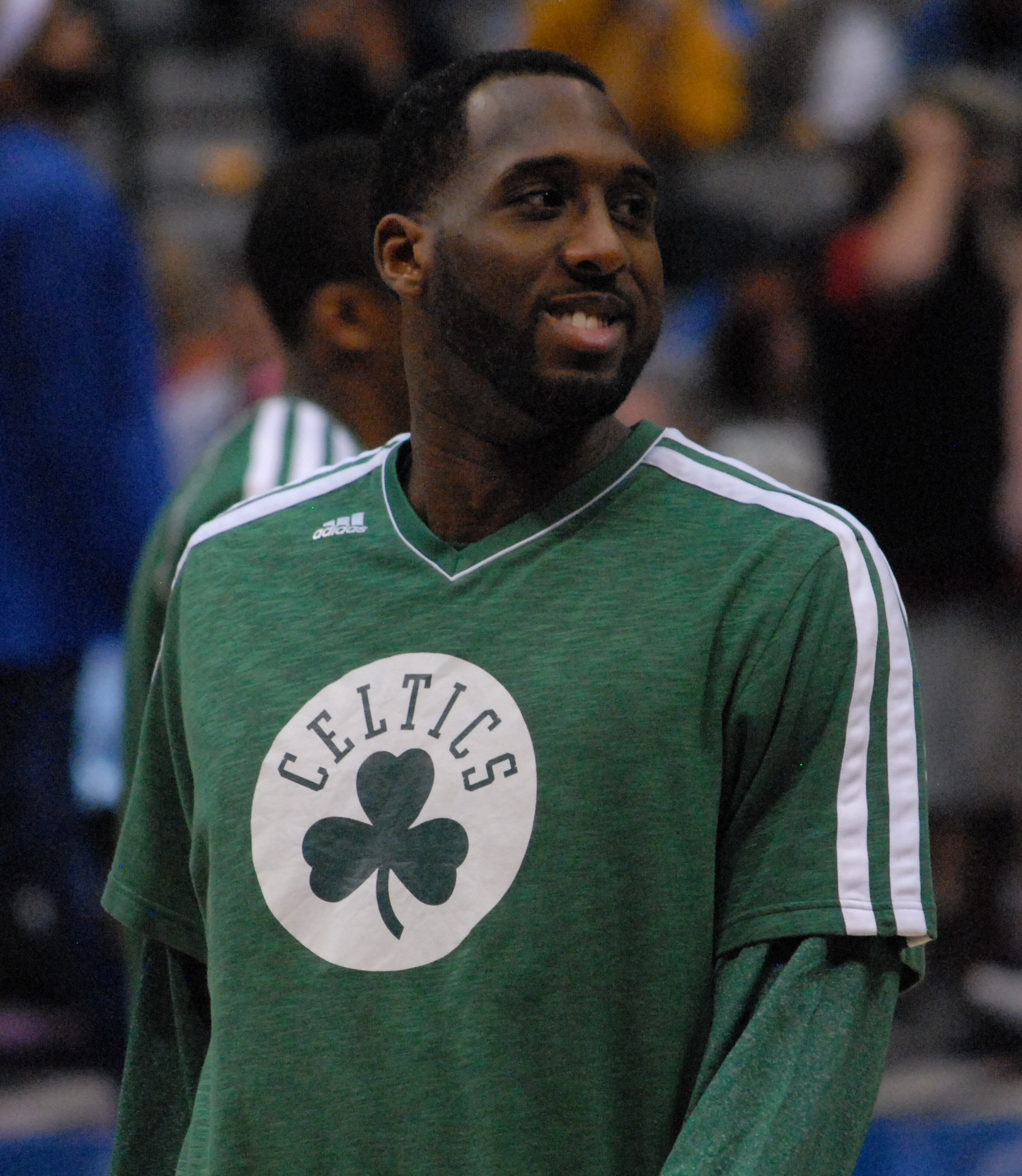
- White with the Boston Celtics in 2013

Oklahoma City Blue
- Title: General manager
- League: NBA G League

Personal information
- Born: August 31, 1986 (age 40) Tuscaloosa, Alabama, U.S.
- Listed height: 6 ft 9 in (2.06 m)
- Listed weight: 250 lb (113 kg)

Career information
- High school: Hillcrest (Tuscaloosa, Alabama)
- College: Indiana (2004–2008)
- NBA draft: 2008: 1st round, 29th overall pick
- Drafted by: Detroit Pistons
- Playing career: 2008–2022
- Position: Power forward

Career history
- 2008–2011: Oklahoma City Thunder
- 2009–2010: →Tulsa 66ers
- 2011–2012: Charlotte Bobcats
- 2012–2013: Shanghai Sharks
- 2013: Boston Celtics
- 2013–2014: Sichuan Blue Whales
- 2014: Charlotte Bobcats
- 2014: Laboral Kutxa
- 2014–2015: Fujian Sturgeons
- 2015–2017: Auxilium Torino
- 2017: Gaziantep
- 2017–2019: Bahçeşehir Koleji
- 2019–2021: Tofaş S.K.
- 2022: Daegu KOGAS Pegasus
- 2022: Piratas de Quebradillas

Career highlights
- Consensus second-team All-American (2008); Big Ten Player of the Year (2008); Big Ten Freshman of the Year (2005); Fourth-team Parade All-American (2004); McDonald's All-American (2004)
- Stats at NBA.com
- Stats at Basketball Reference

Dewayne "D. J." White Jr. (born August 31, 1986) is an American former professional basketball player, who was selected in the first round of the 2008 NBA draft. Standing at 6 ft 9 in (2.06 m), he played the power forward position. He played for parts of six seasons in the NBA, before continuing his career playing overseas. He is currently the general manager of the Oklahoma City Blue in the NBA G League.

== Early life and college ==
A Hillcrest High School standout, White led all freshmen in the Big Ten Conference in scoring during his freshman season with the Indiana Hoosiers. He was named by Rivals.com as a Freshman All-American, and was named a 5-star recruit by Scout.com. He was also selected as the Big Ten Freshman of the Year. In 2008, he was named Big Ten Player of the Year and to the First Team All-Big Ten. He was also named Second Team All-American in 2008.

=== College statistics ===
Year	Team	GP	GS	MPG	FG%	3P%	FT%	RPG	APG	SPG	BPG	PPG
2004–05	Indiana	29	29	28.1	.572		.709	4.9	.8	.5	2.2	13.3
2005–06	Indiana	5	3	17.8	.528		.571	6.0	1.0	.0	.1.4	9.2
2006–07	Indiana	32	32	31.8	.512		.685	7.3	1.3	.9	2.3	13.8
2007–08	Indiana	33	33	33.5	.605	.333	.689	10.3	.8	.8	1.6	17.4
Career		99	97	30.6	.562	.333	.690	7.6	.9	.7	2.0	14.6

== Professional career ==
White was drafted with the 29th pick of the 2008 NBA draft by the Detroit Pistons and traded the same day to the Seattle SuperSonics, who were relocating to Oklahoma City. White's rookie season was delayed when he had to undergo surgery on his jaw to remove a benign growth, causing him to miss the first five months of the season. He finally made his professional debut for the Tulsa 66ers of the NBA D-League on March 18, 2009. In six games he played with Tulsa, he averaged 18.3 points and 7.2 rebounds per game. After that short stint, he was recalled by the Oklahoma City Thunder and made his NBA debut on April 5, 2009, against the Indiana Pacers. During his rookie season, White played in seven games for the Thunder and averaged 8.9 points and 4.6 rebounds.

In the 2009–10 season, White appeared in eight games with Oklahoma City, averaging 4.8 points and 1.9 rebounds, before requiring surgery in January to repair a fractured thumb. After recovering, White was once again assigned to the Tulsa 66ers on March 4, 2010. He was recalled just five days later on March 9 after averaging 23 points and 11 rebounds in four starts for Tulsa. On March 21, White received a standing ovation upon entering the contest during an away game against the Indiana Pacers in the state where he played in college. White scored six points and grabbed two rebounds in 10 minutes of playing time during the game. White returned to the 66ers on April 7, 2010. For a total of 10 games he played for Tulsa that season, he averaged career-highs of 20.2 points and 11.1 rebounds in 39.2 minutes per game on the court. He even appeared in one NBA D-League playoff game for them, scoring 21 points, and having 5 rebounds and 4 assists.

For the beginning of the 2010–11 season, White was retained on the Thunder's 15-man roster, with the Thunder exercising its fourth-year contract option on White on October 25, 2010. On February 24, 2011, White and Morris Peterson were traded to the Charlotte Bobcats for Nazr Mohammed.

In September 2012, White signed with the Shanghai Sharks of China. On February 28, 2013, White signed a 10-day contract with the Boston Celtics. He signed a second 10-day contract with the Celtics on March 10, 2013. On March 20, 2013, White was signed to a multi-year contract by the Celtics.

On July 12, 2013, he was traded to the Brooklyn Nets as part of the blockbuster deal that brought Kevin Garnett and Paul Pierce to Brooklyn. He was subsequently waived by the Nets on July 18.

In September 2013, White joined the Chicago Bulls for their training camp. However, he was waived on October 26.

In November 2013, he signed with the Sichuan Blue Whales for the 2013–14 CBA season.

On March 21, 2014, he signed a 10-day contract with Charlotte Bobcats. On March 31, 2014, he signed a second 10-day contract with the Bobcats. On April 10, 2014, he signed with the Bobcats for the rest of the season.

On October 4, 2014, he signed a one-month deal with Laboral Kutxa Vitoria of the Liga ACB. On November 7, 2014, he parted ways with Laboral Kutxa after his contract expired. On November 25, 2014, he signed with the Fujian Sturgeons of China for the rest of the 2014–15 CBA season.

On July 7, 2015, White joined the Cleveland Cavaliers for the 2015 NBA Summer League. On August 26, 2015, he signed with Auxilium CUS Torino of Italy for the 2015–16 season. On July 22, 2016, he re-signed with Torino for one more season.

On July 8, 2017, White signed with the Turkish Basketball Super League club Gaziantep Basketbol. On December 6, 2017, he left Gaziantep and signed with the Turkish Basketball First League club Bahcesehir Basketbol.

In 2019, White joined Tofaş. He averaged 9.2 points, 2.8 rebounds and 1.3 assists per game. He re-signed with the team on August 22, 2020.

In January 2022, White signed with the Daegu KOGAS Pegasus of the Korean Basketball League to replace Cliff Alexander for two weeks. On February 1, Cliff Alexander was replaced by White for the remainder of the season.

On July 11, 2022, White signed with the Piratas de Quebradillas of the Baloncesto Superior Nacional (BSN)

On August 15, 2022, he has announced his retirement from professional basketball.

== Career statistics ==
Legend
GP	Games played	GS	Games started	MPG	Minutes per game
FG%	Field goal percentage	3P%	3-point field goal percentage	FT%	Free throw percentage
RPG	Rebounds per game	APG	Assists per game	SPG	Steals per game
BPG	Blocks per game	PPG	Points per game	**Bold**	Career high

=== NBA ===
==== Regular season ====
Year	Team	GP	GS	MPG	FG%	3P%	FT%	RPG	APG	SPG	BPG	PPG
2008–09	Oklahoma City	7	0	18.6	.520	.000	.769	**4.6**	**.9**	**.4**	**.7**	**8.9**
2009–10	Oklahoma City	12	0	8.5	**.610**	.000	**.900**	1.9	.3	**.4**	.3	4.9
2010–11	Oklahoma City	23	0	9.5	.462	.000	.500	2.2	.2	.3	.3	2.8
2010–11	Charlotte	24	0	**19.4**	.526	.000	.759	4.4	.6	.3	.5	8.5
2011–12	Charlotte	**58**	**11**	18.9	.493	**1.000**	.705	3.6	.8	.3	.4	6.8
2012–13	Boston	12	0	7.2	.522	.000	.556	1.1	.3	.1	.5	2.4
2013–14	Charlotte	2	0	5.0	.000	.000	.000	1.0	.0	.5	.0	0.0
Career		138	11	15.3	.507	.333	.720	3.2	.6	.3	.4	5.9

==== Playoffs ====
Year	Team	GP	GS	MPG	FG%	3P%	FT%	RPG	APG	SPG	BPG	PPG
2014	Charlotte	1	0	3.0	.000	.000	.000	2.0	.0	.0	.0	0.0
Career		1	0	3.0	.000	.000	.000	2.0	.0	.0	.0	0.0
