= Dan Peters (basketball) =

American basketball coach

Biographical details
- Born: July 15, 1954
- Died: October 27, 2014 (aged 60)

Coaching career (HC unless noted)
- 1976–1978: Guernsey Catholic HS
- 1978–1979: Meadowbrook HS
- 1979–1981: Delta State (asst.)
- 1981–1983: Walsh (asst.)
- 1983–1988: Walsh
- 1988–1989: Western Carolina (asst.)
- 1989–1991: Akron (asst.)
- 1991–1993: Saint Joseph's (IN)
- 1993–1999: Youngstown State
- 1999–2004: Cincinnati (asst.)
- 2004–2009: Ohio State (asst.)
- 2009–2014: Akron (Dir. of Basketball Ops)

Accomplishments and honors

Championships
- Mid-American Conference 2011, 2013

Awards
- Mid-Con Coach of the Year (1998)

Dan Peters (July 15, 1954 – October 27, 2014) was an American basketball coach, most recently the Director of Basketball Operations for the men's basketball team at the University of Akron. Previously, he served as head coach at Youngstown State University, and Walsh University. Dan Peters was an assistant under Bob Huggins before becoming interim head coach at the University of Cincinnati taking over after Bob Huggins was terminated. He then took the job as an assistant coach for Thad Matta at Ohio State University before moving to his final coaching position as the Director of Basketball Operations under Keith Dambrot at the University of Akron.

Peters died on October 27, 2014, from pancreatic cancer.
