= Hillcrest High School (Tuscaloosa, Alabama) =

Public high school near Tuscaloosa, Alabama, United States

Location
- 300 Patriot Parkway; Tuscaloosa, Alabama 35405; United States; 33°07′46″N 87°32′16″W

Information
- Type: Public secondary school
- School district: Tuscaloosa County School System
- CEEB code: 012685
- Principal: Jeff Hinton
- Teaching staff: 79.00 (on an FTE basis)
- Grades: 9-12
- Enrollment: 1,434 (2024-2025)
- Student to teacher ratio: 18.15
- Colors: Scarlet Red, Light Blue & White
- Nickname: Patriots
- Website: hillcresthigh.tcss.net

Hillcrest High School is public high school near Tuscaloosa, Alabama, United States. The school is located in the unincorporated suburban area south of Tuscaloosa informally known as Taylorville. The school is administered by the Tuscaloosa County School System under the authority of the Alabama State Department of Education.

== Athletics ==
In 2019, Hillcrest's baseball team is ranked number 1 in class 6A.

== Use in Media ==
In 2008, Taylor Swift attended prom at Hillcrest with a senior chosen from about 50 applicants in the MTV special "Once Upon a Prom".

== Notable alumni ==
- Tim Anderson (2011), baseball player
- Perrin Buford (2012), basketball player
- Brandon Medders (1998), former MLB player (Arizona Diamondbacks, San Francisco Giants)
- Derrick Oden (1989), NFL player
- Brian Robinson Jr. (2017), running back for the Washington Commanders
- D. J. White (2004), Former NBA Player, currently general manager for the Oklahoma City Blue of the NBA G League
