= Warren Carter (basketball) =

American basketball player (born 1985)

Personal information
- Born: April 23, 1985 (age 41) Dallas, Texas, U.S.
- Listed height: 6 ft 8 2/3 in (2.05 m)
- Listed weight: 220 lb (100 kg)

Career information
- High school: Lake Highlands (Dallas, Texas)
- College: Illinois (2003–2007)
- NBA draft: 2007: undrafted
- Playing career: 2007–2015
- Position: Center / power forward

Career history
- 2007–2008: Mutlu Akü Selçuk Üniversitesi
- 2008–2009: CB Sevilla
- 2009: BK Ventspils
- 2009–2010: Ilisiakos B.C.
- 2010–2011: Hapoel Gilboa Galil Elyon
- 2011–2012: Dexia Mons-Hainaut
- 2012: Elitzur Netanya
- 2012–2013: Antalya BSB
- 2013: Trotamundos de Carabobo
- 2013: San Carlos
- 2013: Ironi Nes Ziona B.C.
- 2014: Otago Nuggets
- 2014–2015: Aix Maurienne
- 2015: Chorale Roanne Basket

Career highlights
- LBL champion (2009); GBL All-Star (2010); Second-team All-Big Ten (2007)

Warren Carter (born April 23, 1985) is an American former professional basketball player who last played for Chorale Roanne Basket of the LNB Pro B. He played college basketball for the University of Illinois.

== Early life ==
For 2 years of his early life and that of his brothers', his mother was in prison, serving a two-year sentence for felony burglary charges.

== High school career ==
Carter attended Lake Highlands High School in Dallas, Texas, where he was a two time All-State honoree. As a senior, he averaged 25.6 points, 12.3 rebounds and 5.2 blocks per game.

College recruiting
Name	Hometown	School	Height	Weight	Commit date
Warren Carter; PF	Dallas, TX	Lake Highlands (Texas)	6 ft 9 in (2.06 m)	220 lb (100 kg)	May 22, 2002
Warren Carter; PF	Recruit ratings: Scout: Rivals:				
Overall recruit ranking: Scout: 18 (PF) Rivals: 25 (PF)
Note: In many cases, Scout, Rivals, 247Sports, On3, and ESPN may conflict in their listings of height and weight.; In these cases, the average was taken. ESPN grades are on a 100-point scale.; Sources: "2003 Illinois Basketball Commitment List". Rivals.; "2003 Illinois Basketball Commitment List". Scout.; "Scout.com Team Recruiting Rankings". Scout.; "2003 Team Ranking". Rivals.

== College career ==
In his freshman season at Illinois, Carter played sparingly. In 17 games, he averaged 1.2 points per game.

Carter played in 33 games in the 2004–05 season when the Illini ranked #1 for most of the season, and ended as the NCAA runner-up to North Carolina Tar Heels. He was a backup for James Augustine and Roger Powell. He averaged 2.2 points and 1.8 rebounds per game.

In the 2005–06 season, Carter saw an increase in playing time, and increased his scoring average to 4.8 points per game. His best point production was on December 28, 2005, where he scored 14 points against SE Missouri St. coming off the bench. He also started in his first college game on December 18, 2005, against Coppin State University. The Illini made it to the 2006 NCAA Tournament, and Carter contributed 12 points in a first-round victory against the U.S. Air Force Academy.

After the first ten games of the 2006–07 season, Carter showed marked improvement, not only starting in each of the games, but leading the team in scoring with a 13.0 points per game. Carter was forced into a leading scoring role based on key early season injuries to Brian Randle and Jamar Smith. On November 28, 2006, he recorded a double-double in a loss to Maryland, scoring 13 points and grabbing 11 rebounds. In the following game, a loss to Arizona, he had another double-double with 24 points and 10 rebounds. He also received the Big Ten Medal of Honor. First awarded in 1914, the Big Ten endowed a Medal of Honor to be given annually to a student in the graduating class of each university that demonstrated proficiency in scholarship and athletics. In 34 games, he averaged 13.7 points, 6.1 rebounds and 2.0 assists per game.

== Professional career ==
=== 2007–08 season ===
After going undrafted in the 2007 NBA draft, Carter joined the Dallas Mavericks for the 2007 NBA Summer League. He later signed with Mutlu Akü Selçuk Üniversitesi of Turkey for the 2007–08 season. In 29 games, he averaged 18 points and 8.5 rebounds per game.

=== 2008–09 season ===
In 2008, Carter signed with CB Sevilla for the 2008–09 season. In February 2009, he left Spain and signed with BK Ventspils of Latvia for the rest of the season. He went on to help Ventspils win the 2009 championship in a 7-game series where he had 15 points, 15 rebounds and 4 blocks in game 7.

=== 2009–10 season ===
In July 2009, Carter joined the New York Knicks for the 2009 NBA Summer League. On September 11, 2009, he signed with the Knicks. However, he was later waived by the Knicks on October 7, 2009.

On November 13, 2009, he signed with Ilisiakos B.C. of Greece for the rest of the 2009–10 season. He went on to compete in the 2010 Greek All-Star game.

=== 2010–11 season ===
On August 24, 2010, Carter signed with Hapoel Gilboa Galil of Israel for the 2010–11 season.

=== 2011–12 season ===
On July 16, 2011, Carter signed with Dexia Mons-Hainaut of Belgium for the 2011–12 season. On March 1, 2012, he left Dexia. The next day, he signed with Elitzur Netanya of Israel for the rest of the season.

=== 2012–13 season ===
On October 3, 2012, Carter signed with Antalya BSB for the rest of the 2012–13 season. In February 2013, he left Antalya.

In March 2013, he joined Trotamundos de Carabobo of Venezuela for the 2013 LPB season. In April 2013, he left after 10 games. In June 2013, he signed with San Carlos of the Dominican Republic for the 2013 District National season.

=== 2013–14 season ===
On October 4, 2013, Carter signed with Ironi Nes Ziona B.C. for the 2013–14 season. In November 2013, he left Ironi after 7 games.

In March 2014, he signed with the Otago Nuggets for the 2014 New Zealand NBL season.

=== 2014–15 season ===
On July 28, 2014, Carter signed with Aix Maurienne Savoie Basket of France for the 2014–15 season. In January 2015, he left Maurienne and signed with Chorale Roanne Basket for the rest of the season. However, he sustained a season-ending shoulder injury in a February 17 game, making him the team's third import of the season to go down with an injury. In a total of 19 Pro B games played in 2014–15, Carter averaged 12.5 points and 5.7 rebounds per game.

== Personal ==
Carter is the son of Cedric and Kamela Carter. His brother, Josh, played college basketball at Texas A&M, while his other brother, Kevin, played college basketball at Collin County Community College.
