= Adam Haluska =

American basketball player (born 1983)

Personal information
- Born: November 16, 1983 (age 42) Carroll, Iowa, U.S.
- Listed height: 6 ft 5 in (1.96 m)
- Listed weight: 210 lb (95 kg)

Career information
- High school: Carroll (Carroll, Iowa)
- College: Iowa State (2002–2003); Iowa (2004–2007)
- NBA draft: 2007: 2nd round, 43rd overall pick
- Drafted by: New Orleans Hornets
- Playing career: 2007–2010
- Position: Shooting guard

Career history
- 2008: Iowa Energy
- 2008–2009: Hapoel Jerusalem
- Stats at Basketball Reference

Adam Haluska (born November 16, 1983) is an American former professional basketball player.

== College career ==
=== Iowa ===
==== 2003–2007 ====
Haluska played college basketball with the Iowa Hawkeyes, and scored 1,847 points in his collegiate career. He was named to the 2007 All-Big Ten Conference First Team just weeks after being named the 2007 Academic All-American of the Year.

Haluska originally started his college career at Iowa State University, before transferring to the University of Iowa after his freshman year. He was named to the Big 12 Conference's All-Freshman Team in his lone year in the conference. Due to the intense rivalry amongst the two colleges, the transfer was deemed quite controversial amongst sports fans at the time. Furthering the controversy, Haluska publicly denied the rumor that he was considering a transfer just one week before officially transferring to Iowa City.

Following his senior year at Iowa, Haluska competed in the three-point shooting competition at the 19th Annual State Farm Slam Dunk and Three Point Championships. Also in the competition were All-Americans Acie Law of Texas A&M, Colin Falls of Notre Dame, Jarius Jackson of Texas Tech, Demetris Nichols of Syracuse and Kammron Taylor of Wisconsin.

On December 2, 2006, Haluska scored a career-high 31 points in an 83–67 win over Coppin State in the title game of the Hawkeye Challenge. His performance included scoring 23 in the second half, with 20 in the final 10 minutes. On December 20, he bettered his career-best with 36 points in a 101–59 victory over Georgia State.

== Professional career ==
=== NBA ===
==== 2007–2008 ====
Haluska was selected by the New Orleans Hornets in the second round of the 2007 NBA draft with the 43rd overall pick. On February 21, 2008, he was traded to the Houston Rockets in a three-team deal that also sent Bobby Jackson and a draft pick to Houston, in exchange for Bonzi Wells and Mike James. The Rockets announced, on February 26, that they had released Haluska as the team had signed Bobby Jones to a 10-day contract.

Haluska has played in seven NBA preseason games (four with New Orleans and three with Dallas). He averaged 5.6 points per game with a .577 field goal percentage.

Although Haluska spent time with both the Hornets and the Rockets, he never actually played in an official NBA game with either team. After being released by the Rockets, Haluska played for the Iowa Energy of the D-League in 2008.

=== Israel ===
==== Hapoel Jerusalem B.C. ====
In August 2008, Haluska joined Hapoel Jerusalem of the Israeli league where he played the 2008–2009 season, but was injured early on in the season and was subsequently waived by the team.

== Personal ==
Haluska's younger brother, Sean, played basketball at Iowa State University.
