= Alando Tucker =

American basketball player (born 1984)

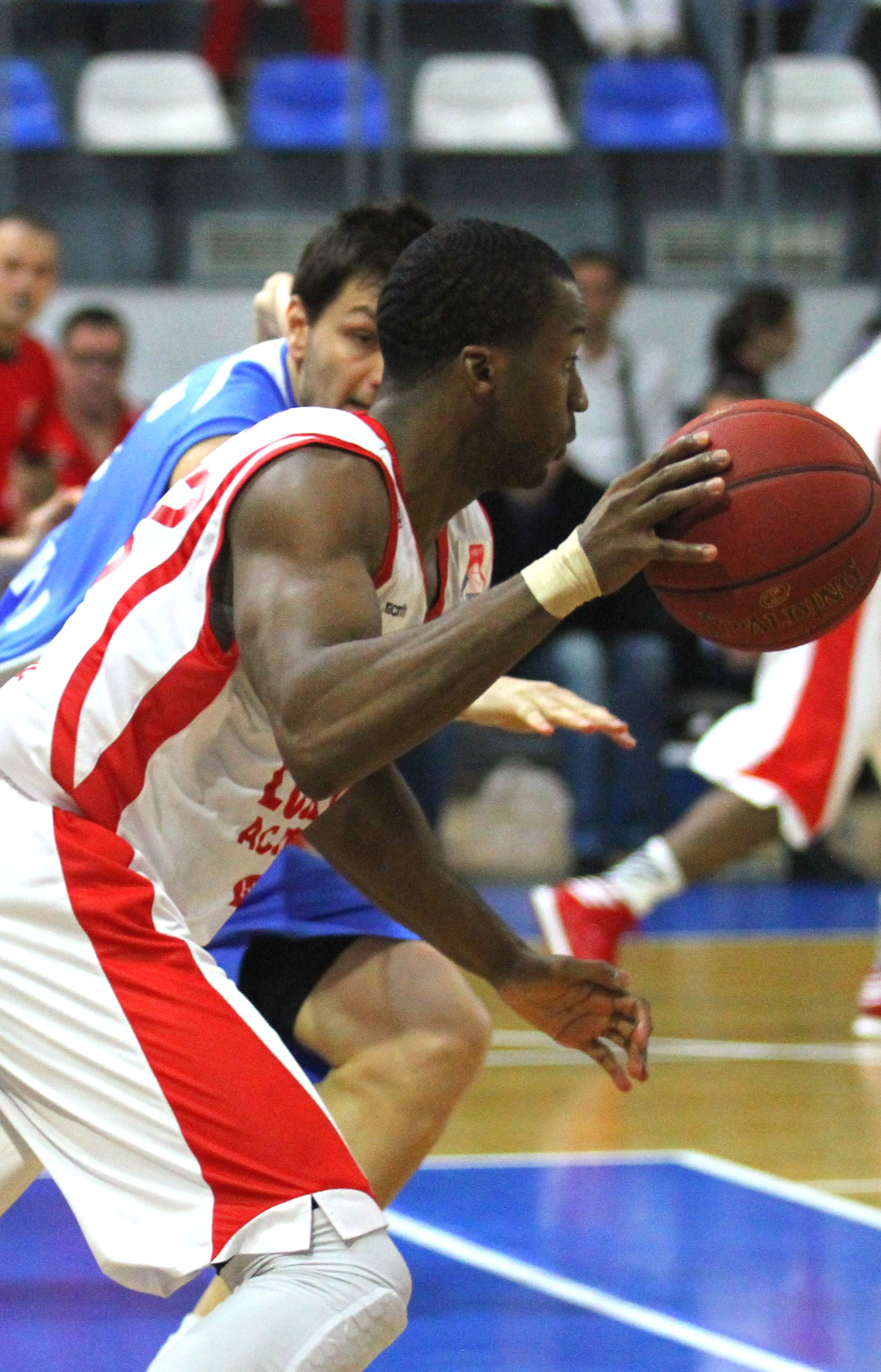
- Tucker in 2014 with Lukoil Academic

Personal information
- Born: February 11, 1984 (age 42) Joliet, Illinois, U.S.
- Listed height: 6 ft 6 in (1.98 m)
- Listed weight: 205 lb (93 kg)

Career information
- High school: Lockport Township (Lockport, Illinois)
- College: Wisconsin (2002–2007)
- NBA draft: 2007: 1st round, 29th overall pick
- Drafted by: Phoenix Suns
- Playing career: 2007–2017
- Position: Small forward / shooting guard
- Number: 29
- Coaching career: 2019–present

Career history

Playing
- 2007–2009: Phoenix Suns
- 2007–2008: →Albuquerque Thunderbirds
- 2008–2009: →Iowa Energy
- 2009–2010: Minnesota Timberwolves
- 2010: Gallitos de Isabela
- 2010–2011: Lokomotiv Kuban
- 2011: Gran Canaria
- 2012: Texas Legends
- 2013: Inter Bratislava
- 2013–2014: Lukoil Academic
- 2014–2015: SOMB Boulogne-sur-Mer
- 2015: SLUC Nancy
- 2015–2016: Maccabi Kiryat Gat
- 2016–2017: Hapoel Tel Aviv
- 2017: Hapoel Eilat

Coaching
- 2019–2021: Wisconsin (assistant)

Career highlights
- Consensus first-team All-American (2007); Big Ten Player of the Year (2007); 2× First-team All-Big Ten (2006, 2007); Big Ten All-Freshman Team (2003); Senior CLASS Award (2007)
- Stats at NBA.com
- Stats at Basketball Reference

Alando Forest Tucker (born February 11, 1984) is an American former professional basketball player who played in the National Basketball Association (NBA). Before joining the NBA, he played college basketball for the Wisconsin Badgers, where he became its all-time leading scorer with a total of 2,217 points.

From 2007 to 2017, Tucker had a 10-year career in professional basketball, which included playing for the Phoenix Suns and Minnesota Timberwolves for three years in the NBA. His last team was the Hapoel Eilat of the Israeli Premier League in 2017, before going into retirement.

In 2019, he became the interim assistant coach for his alma mater's men's basketball team at the University of Wisconsin, a position he held until April 2021.

== High school career ==
Tucker attended Lockport Township High School in Lockport, Illinois. He averaged 21.6 points and seven rebounds per game as a junior. He was one of only two juniors to be named to the Herald News AA all-area team.

As a senior Tucker earned all-state honors averaging 22.2 points while hauling in 7.7 rebounds and dishing 5.7 assists per game. He scored 35 points against Joliet Township, the number one ranked team in the state.

After seeing drugs and gang violence from up close throughout his childhood, Tucker and his older brother Antonio made a pact to stay clean and away from substances such as drug, tobacco, and alcohol, as well as tattoos.

== Collegiate career ==
Tucker started off his college basketball career in 2002–03 starting 27 of 32 games as a freshman. He averaged 12.0 points and 5.9 rebounds per game, which helped the Badgers achieve 24 wins, a Big Ten title, and a Sweet 16 at the NCAA Division I men's basketball tournament during that season.

In 2003–04, Tucker played in just four games because of a right foot injury. He applied for and received a medical redshirt after the season.

During the 2004–05 season, Tucker started 30 out of 31 games. He led the Badgers in scoring with 15.2 points. He also averaged 6.1 rebounds. At the end of the 2006–07 regular season, Tucker averaged 19.9 points, 5.4 rebounds and 2.0 assists.

For the 2006–07 season, Tucker and the Badgers achieved 30 wins and earned their first ever #1 AP ranking in the school's history. On February 10, 2007, Tucker reached the 2,000-point mark in his collegiate career in a game against Iowa. He was the second Wisconsin Badger to ever accomplish this, after Michael Finley.

On March 10, 2007, Tucker broke the all-time Wisconsin scoring record (2,147 points) previously held by Michael Finley. During this time, he also broke Finley's UW vertical jump record.

Tucker's collegiate career ended on March 18, 2007, when the Badgers lost to the UNLV Runnin' Rebels 74–68 in the second round of the NCAA Tournament. Tucker finished with 17 points on 4–11 shooting from the field and 8–13 from the line. He also had seven rebounds.

In his final season, he was named Big Ten Player of the Year, an NCAA 1st Team All-American, and received Lowe's Senior CLASS Award. He also set school marks at the time for games played (134), starts (126), minutes played (4,297), field goals (798), free throws (520), free throw attempts (817), offensive rebounds (769), and overall points scored (2,217).

Tucker graduated from the University of Wisconsin–Madison on May 19, 2007, with a bachelor's degree in Life Sciences Communication.

In 2018, he was inducted to UW Athletic's Hall of Fame for his accomplishments in basketball.

== Pro career ==
=== NBA career ===
Tucker was selected 29th overall in the first round of the 2007 NBA draft by the Phoenix Suns.

==== First Albuquerque Thunderbirds assignment ====
After appearing in two games for Phoenix, Tucker was assigned to the Suns' NBA Development League affiliate Albuquerque Thunderbirds on November 27, 2007. His performances include a 25-point, 12-rebound effort in a 92–84 loss to Idaho on December 1, 40 points (on 15-of-25 shooting, including 4-of-4 three-pointers) in a 109–102 win over Bakersfield on December 14, and 32 points in a 100–97 victory over Anaheim on December 15. Tucker was recalled by the Suns on December 18.

==== Second Albuquerque Thunderbirds assignment ====
On January 11, 2008, he was reassigned to Albuquerque, and recalled ten days later. His performances include a team-high 33 points and 10 rebounds in a 123–117 win over Austin on January 12, 39 points in a 92–91 win over Rio Grande Valley on January 13, a game-high 26 points (on 11-of-19 field goals) in a 98–81 loss to Colorado on January 15, and a game-high 29 points in a 104–84 loss to Dakota on January 19.

==== Third Albuquerque Thunderbirds assignment ====
He was assigned a third time on March 13, 2008. In 21 total games (19 starts), he averaged 27.7 points, 6.0 rebounds and 1.6 assists. Tucker's performances in his third assignment include scoring a Thunderbirds season-high 42 points in a 116–100 victory over Los Angeles on March 16, a 38-point effort in a 119–104 win over Tulsa on March 20, 33 points (including 14 in the final quarter) in a 114–108 win over Tulsa on March 21, 38 points in a 119–115 loss to Rio Grande Valley on March 30, and 34 points in a 118–112 victory over Tulsa on April 5. Tucker was recalled to the Suns on April 7. He received Honorable Mention for D-League Performer of the Week for March 17, 2008.

==== Iowa Energy ====
Tucker was assigned to the Suns' new D-League affiliate Iowa Energy on December 26, 2008. He was recalled on January 2, 2009, after playing two games with the Energy. His Iowa season-high was a 13-point effort in a 107–101 win over Utah on December 28.

==== Minnesota Timberwolves ====
On December 29, 2009, Tucker was traded along with a second round pick and cash considerations to the Minnesota Timberwolves for Jason Hart. He was waived by the Timberwolves on March 22, 2010.

==== Texas Legends ====
In November 2011, Tucker was selected by the Texas Legends with the second pick in the NBA D-League Draft. However, Tucker decided to play in Spain instead.

==== Milwaukee Bucks ====
On October 1, 2012, Tucker signed with the Milwaukee Bucks. He was waived by the team on October 27, 2012.

=== International career ===
In April 2010 he signed with pro team Gallitos de Isabela in Puerto Rico.

On August 11, 2010, he signed a contract with the Russian club Lokomotiv Kuban from Krasnodar, Russia.

In November 2011, Tucker signed with CB Gran Canaria in Spain.

In February 2013, Tucker signed with BK Inter Bratislava in Slovakia. He won a championship in the same year.

In September 2013, he signed with Lukoil Academic where he averaged 16.6 points and 6.6 rebounds per game.

On November 28, 2014, he signed with French club SOMB Boulogne-sur-Mer.

On July 7, 2015, he has signed with LNB Pro A side SLUC Nancy. He averaged 10.9 points in 7 LNB matches before he moved to Israel.

On November 11, 2015, Tucker signed with Maccabi Kiryat Gat of the Israeli Premier League.

On June 23, 2016, Tucker signed with Hapoel Tel Aviv of the Israeli Premier League. He went on to become Hapoel's first ever American captain in the 80-years of history of the team.

On August 2, 2017, Tucker signed with Hapoel Eilat for the 2017–18 season. However, on November 14, 2017, Tucker was released by Eilat after appearing in six games.

== Achievements and awards ==
- Broke Michael Finley's UW school record for UW's All Time Leading Scorer with 2,217 points.
- Broke Devin Harris's UW school record for most points in a single season.
- Broke Michael Finley's UW school record for vertical leap as a freshman by jumping 38 inches.
- 2002–03 – Set UW record for offensive rebounds (86) for a freshman
- 2002–03 – Big Ten Conference All-Freshman Team
- 2004–05 – Big Ten and Syracuse Regional all-tournament teams
- 2004–05 – Consensus third-team All-Big Ten selection
- 2005–06 – First team All-Big Ten selection
- 2006–07 – Consensus first team All-Big Ten selection
- 2006–07 – Big Ten Player of the Year
- 2006–07 – First Team All-American (National Association of Basketball Coaches)
- 2006–07 – First Team All-American (The Sporting News)
- 2006–07 – Senior CLASS Award

== NBA career statistics ==
Legend
GP	Games played	GS	Games started	MPG	Minutes per game
FG%	Field goal percentage	3P%	3-point field goal percentage	FT%	Free throw percentage
RPG	Rebounds per game	APG	Assists per game	SPG	Steals per game
BPG	Blocks per game	PPG	Points per game	**Bold**	Career high

=== Regular season ===
Year	Team	GP	GS	MPG	FG%	3P%	FT%	RPG	APG	SPG	BPG	PPG
2007–08	Phoenix	6	0	8.0	.364	.250	**.833**	**1.3**	.0	.0	**.2**	3.7
2008–09	Phoenix	**30**	**1**	**9.4**	.430	**.348**	.788	1.0	**.4**	**.2**	.0	**4.6**
2009–10	Phoenix	11	0	6.5	.433	.143	.762	.6	.3	.0	.0	3.9
2009–10	Minnesota	4	0	6.3	**.444**	.000	.000	.8	.3	.0	.0	2.0
Career		51	1	8.4	.423	.294	.783	1.0	.3	.1	.0	4.1

== Coaching career ==
=== University of Wisconsin–Madison ===
Tucker was first invited by UW—Madison to join as Director of Student-Athlete Engagement in February 2017, a position in which he oversaw health and safety policies for athletes and staff. After two years in this role, on July 31, 2019, he was announced as interim assistant coach on for the Badgers for the 2019–20 season.

He was hired by head coach Greg Gard to fill the role of Howard Moore, who left his position as assistant coach after being involved in a car accident that left him with serious injuries. Tucker was known for his ability to develop close relationships with the players, which led him to remain as interim assistant coach throughout the 2020–21 season, enjoying popularity among players and fans alike.

Following the conclusion of the 2020–21 season, Tucker applied to become a full-time assistant coach, but Wisconsin officials decided to part ways with him. Allegations surfaced in local media surrounding Tucker's desire to take over the head coaching job, but he later dismissed these as rumors and denied any accusations of wrongdoing.

He finished his 2-year stint with a Big Ten Conference Championship for the 2019 regular season and a 39–23 record.

== Personal life ==
During his stint at Hapoel Tel Aviv, Tucker partnered with an Israeli “Hoops for Kids International” non-for-profit organization for speaking engagements, basketball clinics, and mentorship to impoverished children throughout the Middle East. He remains passionate about philanthropy and giving back to the community.

He currently resides with his wife, Krystal, and their three sons in Chicago, where he is a member of the board of directors for the Special Olympics' local committee.
