= 2006–07 Maryland Terrapins men's basketball team =

American college basketball season

2006–07 Maryland Terrapins men's basketball
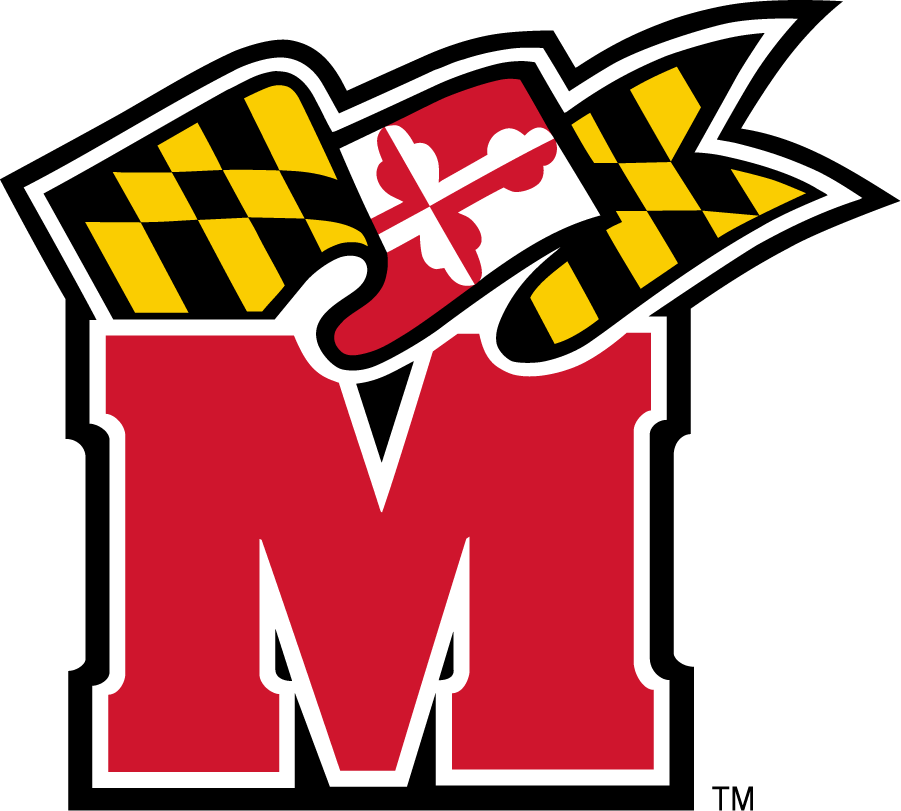

NCAA Tournament, Round of 32
- Conference: Atlantic Coast Conference

Ranking
- Coaches: No. 23
- AP: No. 18
- Record: 25–9 (10–6 ACC)
- Head coach: Gary Williams
- Home arena: Comcast Center

2006–07 ACC men's basketball standings
	Conf.				Overall
Team	W		L	PCT	W		L	PCT
No. 4 North Carolina†	11	–	5	.688	31	–	7	.816
Virginia	11	–	5	.688	21	–	11	.656
Virginia Tech	10	–	6	.625	22	–	12	.647
Boston College	10	–	6	.625	21	–	12	.636
No. 18 Maryland	10	–	6	.625	25	–	9	.735
Georgia Tech	8	–	8	.500	20	–	12	.625
Duke	8	–	8	.500	22	–	11	.667
Clemson	7	–	9	.438	25	–	11	.694
Florida State	7	–	9	.438	22	–	13	.629
NC State	5	–	11	.313	20	–	16	.556
Wake Forest	5	–	11	.313	15	–	16	.484
Miami (FL)	4	–	12	.250	12	–	20	.375
† 2007 ACC tournament winner Rankings from AP Poll

The 2006–07 Maryland Terrapins men's basketball team represented the University of Maryland in the 2006–07 college basketball season as a member of the Atlantic Coast Conference (ACC). The team was led by 18th-year head coach Gary Williams. Maryland finished with a 25–9 record, and advanced to the second round of the NCAA tournament, where they were defeated by Butler.

== Roster ==
Note: Flags indicate national team eligibility at FIBA sanctioned events. Players may hold other non-FIBA nationality not displayed.

No.		Position	Player
1	(United States)	F	Landon Milbourne
2	(United States)	G	D. J. Strawberry
5	(United States)	G	Eric Hayes
10	(United States)	G	Jason McAlpin
15	(United States)	F	James Gist
21	(Venezuela)	G	Greivis Vasquez
23	(United States)	G	Mike Jones

No.		Position	Player
24	(United States)	G	Parrish Brown
25	(Nigeria)	F	Ekene Ibekwe
31	(United States)	C	Will Bowers
32	(United States)	F	Jerome Burney
33	(United States)	F	Gini Chukura
35	(United States)	F	Dave Neal
50	(United States)	F	Bambale Osby

== 2006–2007 Schedule and Results ==
Date time, TV	Rank^{#}	Opponent^{#}	Result	Record	Site (attendance) city, state
Regular season
November 7, 2006*; 8:30 pm, ESPNU		Hampton; 2K Sports College Hoops Classic	W 102–75	1–0	Comcast Center (7,148); College Park, MD
November 8, 2006*; 7:00 pm, ESPN2		Vermont; 2K Sports College Hoops Classic	W 81–63	2–0	Comcast Center (7,318); College Park, MD
November 12, 2006*; 7:00 pm, CSN		Florida A&M	W 93–54	3–0	Comcast Center (17,950); College Park, MD
November 16, 2006*; 7:00 pm, ESPN2		vs. St. John's; 2K Sports College Hoops Classic Semifinal	W 92–60	4–0	Madison Square Garden (8,103); New York, NY
November 17, 2006*; 9:00 pm		vs. Michigan State; 2K Sports College Hoops Classic Final	W 81–63	5–0	Madison Square Garden (7,358); New York, NY
November 20, 2006*; 8:00 pm, CSN	No. 25	Winthrop	W 71–60	6–0	Comcast Center (17,950); College Park, MD
November 24, 2006*; 1:30 pm, CSN	No. 25	High Point	W 81–63	7–0	Comcast Center (17,950); College Park, MD
November 28, 2006*; 6:00 pm, ESPN	No. 23	at Illinois; ACC/Big Ten Challenge	W 72–66	8–0	Assembly Hall (16,618); Champaign, IL
December 3, 2006*; 6:30 pm, CSN/CSS	No. 23	vs. Notre Dame; BB&T Classic	L 74–81	8–1	Verizon Center (16,924); Washington, D.C.
December 6, 2006*; 8:00 pm	No. 23	Fordham	W 79–59	9–1	Comcast Center (17,950); College Park, MD
December 10, 2006; 6:30 pm, FSN	No. 23	at Boston College	L 62–73	9–2	Conte Forum (8,606); Chestnut Hill, MA
December 13, 2006*; 8:00 pm, CSN		Missouri-Kansas City	W 101–50	10–2	Comcast Center (17,950); College Park, MD
December 23, 2006*; 1:00 pm, CSN		American	W 66–54	11–2	Comcast Center (17,950); College Park, MD
December 28, 2006*; 8:00 pm		Mount St. Mary's	W 91–50	12–2	Comcast Center (17,950); College Park, MD
December 31, 2006*; 1:00 pm		Siena	W 94–75	13–2	Comcast Center (17,950); College Park, MD
January 4, 2007*; 8:00 pm, CSN		Iona	W 88–57	14–2	Comcast Center (17,950); College Park, MD
January 10, 2007; 9:00 pm, RLF		Miami (FL)	L 58–63	14–3	Comcast Center (17,950); College Park, MD
January 13, 2007; 2:00 pm, ESPNU		No. 17 Clemson	W 92–87	15–3	Comcast Center (17,950); College Park, MD
January 16, 2007; 8:00 pm, RLF		at Virginia	L 91–103	15–4	John Paul Jones Arena (14,765); Charlottesville, VA
January 21, 2007; 7:30 pm, FSN		at Virginia Tech	L 64–67 ^{OT}	15–5	Cassell Coliseum (9,847); Blacksburg, VA
January 24, 2007; 9:00 pm, RLF		Georgia Tech	W 80–65	16–5	Comcast Center (17,950); College Park, MD
January 30, 2007; 8:00 pm, RLF		at Florida State	L 79–96	16–6	Donald L. Tucker Center (8,894); Tallahassee, FL
February 3, 2007; 8:00 pm, RLF		at Wake Forest	W 79–72	17–6	Lawrence Joel Veterans Memorial Coliseum (13,089); Winston-Salem, NC
February 6, 2007; 9:00 pm, RLF		Virginia	L 65–69	17–7	Comcast Center (17,950); College Park, MD
February 11, 2007; 5:00 pm, FSN		No. 16 Duke	W 72–60	18–7	Comcast Center (17,950); College Park, MD
February 14, 2007; 7:00 pm, ESPN2		at North Carolina State	W 85–70	19–7	RBC Center (16,384); Raleigh, NC
February 18, 2007; 4:00 pm, RLF		at Clemson	W 82–66	20–7	Littlejohn Coliseum (9,478); Clemson, SC
February 21, 2007; 9:00 pm, RLF		Florida State	W 73–55	21–7	Comcast Center (17,950); College Park, MD
February 25, 2007; 5:30 pm, FSN		No. 5 North Carolina	W 89–87	22–7	Comcast Center (17,950); College Park, MD
February 28, 2007; 9:00 pm, ESPN	No. 24	at No. 14 Duke	W 85–77	23–7	Cameron Indoor Stadium (9,314); Durham, NC
March 3, 2007; 3:30 pm, ABC	No. 24	North Carolina State	W 79–59	24–7	Comcast Center (17,950); College Park, MD
ACC tournament
March 8, 2007; 2:00 pm, RLF	No. 17	vs. Miami (FL); First Round	L 62–67	24–8	St. Pete Times Forum (22,269); Tampa, FL
NCAA tournament
March 15, 2007*; 12:20 pm, CBS	(4 MW) No. 18	vs. (13 MW) Davidson; First Round	W 82–70	25–8	HSBC Arena (18,646); Buffalo, NY
March 17, 2007*; 3:20 pm, CBS	(4 MW) No. 18	vs. (5 MW) Butler; Second Round	L 59–62	25–9	HSBC Arena (18,801); Buffalo, NY
*Non-conference game. ^{#}Rankings from AP Poll. (#) Tournament seedings in parentheses. MW=Midwest.
