= Dave Leitao =

American college basketball coach (born 1960)

Current position
- Title: Head coach
- Team: Cold Hearts
- Conference: Overtime Elite
- Record: 9–4

Biographical details
- Born: May 18, 1960 (age 66); New Bedford, Massachusetts, U.S.

Playing career
- 1978–1982: Northeastern
- Position: Forward

Coaching career (HC unless noted)
- 1984–1986: Northeastern (assistant)
- 1986–1994: Connecticut (assistant)
- 1994–1996: Northeastern
- 1996–2002: Connecticut (assistant)
- 2002–2005: DePaul
- 2005–2009: Virginia
- 2011–2012: Maine Red Claws
- 2012–2014: Missouri (assistant)
- 2014–2015: Tulsa (assistant)
- 2015–2021: DePaul

Head coaching record
- Overall: 211–239 (.469) (college)
- Tournaments: 2–2 (NCAA Division I); 1–3 (NIT); 2–1 (CBI)

Accomplishments and honors

Championships
- C-USA regular season (2004); ACC regular season (2007)

Awards
- ACC Coach of the Year (2007)

David Antonio Leitao Jr. (born May 18, 1960) is an American professional basketball coach who is the head coach for City Reapers of Overtime Elite (OTE). He has previously been the head coach of the Maine Red Claws of the NBA Development League, DePaul University, the University of Virginia, and his alma mater; Northeastern University. He was named the 2006–07 Atlantic Coast Conference Coach of the Year by the Associated Press, but finished at 10th and 11th place in the conference during his final two years with the Virginia Cavaliers. He resigned as the Virginia basketball coach on March 18, 2009. Leitao is Cape Verdean American. He was the first coach of African descent to coach any varsity sport in University of Virginia history.

== Biography ==
=== Playing career ===
The 6'7" forward was recruited by Jim Calhoun to play basketball at Northeastern University. From 1978 to 1982 Leitao played at Northeastern, where he averaged 6.0 points and 5.4 rebounds per game. The teams made it to the NCAA tournament twice, and posted an overall 79–34 record. Leitao is a brother of the Omicron chapter of Iota Phi Theta fraternity.

=== Early coaching career ===
Leitao was recruited by Calhoun to join his staff at Northeastern University in 1984, and followed him to the University of Connecticut as an assistant from 1986 to 1994. He returned to serve as head coach at his alma mater, Northeastern University, from 1994 to 1996. Leitao returned to Calhoun's staff for six seasons, including the Huskies national championship in 1999.

=== DePaul ===
He secured the head coaching position at DePaul University on April 16, 2002, six weeks after his predecessor Pat Kennedy had resigned from the position on March 5. The Blue Demons qualified for the postseason in each of Leitao's three years at DePaul, appearing in the NIT in 2003 and 2005 and the NCAA tournament in 2004. His overall record with the Blue Demons after those three seasons was 58–34. Jerry Wainwright succeeded him on April 28, 2005.

=== Virginia ===
Leitao replaced Pete Gillen when the University of Virginia bought out the final five years of Leitao's contract with DePaul on April 15, 2005. He became the first person of African descent to coach any varsity sport in Virginia Cavaliers history. Leitao was hired by Virginia's Craig Littlepage, the first African-American athletics director in ACC history. He inherited a team that finished last in the ACC in 2004–05.

His first season at Virginia, with only seven scholarship players, the Cavaliers were picked last in the ACC by reporters, but surprisingly finished in a 7th place tie at 15–15 overall, 7–9 in the ACC and a berth in the NIT. Getting contributions from little known front court players including Jason Cain and Tunji Soroye, Virginia was able to upset #23 North Carolina on Jan. 19. Most of the season's success was due to All-ACC first team Sean Singletary, who carried the team with JR Reynolds. This year also marked the last year at University Hall for the Cavaliers. Labeled as the "Last Ball At U-Hall", Virginia was ready to move into the new state of the art John Paul Jones Arena right next door. This marked the end of an era that Ralph Sampson built, bringing flashbacks and reunions to mark the final season at University Hall. The year finished with a disappointing loss to Maryland to close out U-Hall and a blowout loss at Stanford in the NIT. At this point, things were looking up for Leitao and the Virginia Cavaliers. With its core returning and a new group of recruits, Virginia looked to turn its fortunes around in 2006–07.

Leitao started his second year with the opening of the new John Paul Jones arena and an upset win over Arizona. Led by Sean Singletary and J. R. Reynolds, Virginia finished with an 11–5 conference record and a share of the ACC regular season title with North Carolina. Memorable wins came over Duke, with Sean Singletary's fadeaway floater and stare on ESPN, while memorable losses came in Puerto Rico and last place Wake Forest. This was Leitao's best year with the Cavaliers. On March 6, 2007, Leitao was voted as the 2007 ACC Coach of the Year by the Associated Press in conjunction with the Atlantic Coast Sports Media Association. Two days later, the National Association of Basketball Coaches (NABC) named Dave Leitao the 2007 District 5 Coach of the Year. In the NCAA tournament, the #4 seeded Cavaliers defeated the University at Albany in the first round in an 84–57 rout. In the second round, Sean Singletary's last-second shot bounced off the rim and the Cavaliers were defeated by the University of Tennessee in a 77–74 loss. The team completed the 2006–2007 season with a record of 21–11 (11–5 ACC).

Leitao's third season (2007–2008) was marked with close losses and early injuries to the team's top two frontcourt players, Tunji Soroye and Laurynas Mikalauskas; the two injured players only appeared in two games and sixteen games, respectively. The team attained a 4–3 record with Mikalauskas in the line-up versus a 1–8 record with him injured. Without these two players, the Cavaliers proceeded to lose seven games by two points or less or in overtime; the team ended the season with a record of 17–16 (5–11 ACC). However, as injured players began to return to the team, the Cavaliers won six of their final ten games, and advanced to the semifinals of the inaugural College Basketball Invitational.

In Leitao's fourth year (2008–09), Virginia was the unanimous pick for last place in the ACC. In December, UVA looked as if they were going to be the surprise of the ACC with their first ACC win coming at Georgia Tech. However, Georgia Tech was the surprise finishing last with UVA coming in 11th place at 4–12 in the league. Leitao's frustrated team was led by Sylven Landesberg who averaged 16.8 points per game and captured the ACC Rookie of the Year award. Other notables: Assane Sene missed early and late parts of the season with ankle injuries while showing some promise as a young defensive stopper. Sammy Zeglinski, Leitao's first recruit, gained valuable experience at point guard after being red-shirted in 2007–08 with an ankle injury. Overall, fans were quite discouraged with the lack of improvements and player rotation. 4th year Mamadi Diane's career hit the lowest point during a 4-game stretch where he did not log a single minute. However, he did return for 23 points in his Senior Day finale and 24 points in the first round loss to BC in the ACC tournament. Leitao resigned as head coach on March 16, 2009, at the conclusion of a 10–18 season and 11th-place finish in the ACC. The 10–18 season was Virginia's worst season since the 1966–67 season, when the team posted a 9–17 record. Leitao was paid $2.1 million in a contract buyout by the University of Virginia. Tony Bennett succeeded him two weeks later on March 30.

=== Maine Red Claws ===
On July 21, 2011, Leitao was named head coach of the Maine Red Claws of the NBA Development League. Leitao left the Red Claws after one season to become an assistant coach at the University of Missouri under Frank Haith.

=== Return to DePaul ===
Leitao returned to DePaul on March 29, 2015, replacing Oliver Purnell who had resigned fifteen days prior on March 14 after a 12–20 campaign which ended with an eight-game losing streak and concluded a five-year stretch in which the Blue Demons went 54–105. DePaul, which conducted the process of finding a new head coach with Parker Executive Search, was criticized by fans because of the perception of the university being stuck in the past and not moving into the future. The Blue Demons won only 9 games in both the 2015–16 and 2016–17 seasons, the first two of Leitao's latest tenure at the school. In his third season, the Blue Demons improved slightly, winning 11 games.

The 2018–2019 season, Leitao's fourth, saw a turnaround for DePaul as the Blue Demons finished with a 19–17 overall record. Leitao's squad won their tenth game before mid-January with a non-conference schedule ranked last in the Big East. The season also saw the Blue Demons beat a ranked opponent for the first time in several years, winning 79–71 against No. 24 St. John's, who was playing without its best player, Shamorie Ponds. Following the regular season, the Blue Demons were invited to the 2019 College Basketball Invitational tournament. The team finished as runner-up to the University of South Florida Bulls. In the Best of Three Championship series, DePaul beat South Florida in game 2, but dropped games one and three to the Bulls to give DePaul a second-place finish in the tournament.

In the 2019–2020 season, Leitao began the season suspended due to a recruiting violation in connection with a former player. He made his season debut at Iowa following assistant Tim Anderson coaching the Blue Demons to three straight wins. He won nine of his first ten games of the season including an upset at Iowa and an exciting overtime win against Texas Tech at home. After coaching DePaul to 9 of its 12 non-conference wins and only losing a single non-conference game, Leitao coached the team to a 3–15 conference record, enough to land the team in last place of the Big East conference for the fourth consecutive season. Leitao won a Big East Tournament game for the first time ever, beating Xavier 71–67. The remainder of the tournament would be cancelled the next day due to concerns over the coronavirus. While DePaul won 16 games this season, only 13 of those wins are attributable to Dave Leitao's head coaching record, as he was suspended for and did not coach in three of DePaul's wins. Following the season, DePaul extended Leitao's contract through the 2023–24 season.

At the conclusion of the 2020–21 season, DePaul fired Leitao on the heels the program's fifth straight last place conference finish.

=== Team Elite ===
On May 6, 2021, Leitao was hired as the head coach of Team Elite of the prep basketball league Overtime Elite (OTE).

== Head coaching record ==
Record table
Season	Team	Overall	Conference	Standing	Postseason
Northeastern Huskies (North Atlantic Conference) (1994–1996)
1994–95	Northeastern	18–11	10–6	3rd	
1995–96	Northeastern	4–24	2–16	10th	
Northeastern:		22–35 (.386)	12–22 (.353)		
DePaul Blue Demons (Conference USA) (2002–2005)
2002–03	DePaul	16–13	8–8	T–6th	NIT First Round
2003–04	DePaul	22–10	12–4	1st	NCAA Division I Second Round
2004–05	DePaul	20–11	10–6	T–4th	NIT Second Round
Virginia Cavaliers (Atlantic Coast Conference) (2005–2009)
2005–06	Virginia	15–15	7–9	T–7th	NIT First Round
2006–07	Virginia	21–11	11–5	T–1st	NCAA Division I Second Round
2007–08	Virginia	17–16	5–11	10th	CBI Semifinal
2008–09	Virginia	10–18	4–12	11th	
Virginia:		63–60 (.512)	27–37 (.422)		
DePaul Blue Demons (Big East Conference) (2015–2021)
2015–16	DePaul	9–22	3–15	9th	
2016–17	DePaul	9–23	2–16	10th	
2017–18	DePaul	11–20	4–14	T–9th	
2018–19	DePaul	19–17	7–11	T-8th	CBI Runner-up
2019–20	DePaul	16–16	3–15	10th	
2020–21	DePaul	5–15	2–14	11th	
DePaul:		127–147 (.464)	51–103 (.331)		
Total:		212–242 (.467)			
National champion Postseason invitational champion Conference regular season champion Conference regular season and conference tournament champion Division regular season champion Division regular season and conference tournament champion Conference tournament champion
