= 2006–07 Florida State Seminoles men's basketball team =

American college basketball season

2006–07 Florida State Seminoles men's basketball

NIT, 3rd round
- Conference: Atlantic Coast Conference
- Record: 22-13 (7-9 ACC)
- Head coach: Leonard Hamilton
- Home arena: Donald L. Tucker Civic Center

2006–07 ACC men's basketball standings
	Conf.				Overall
Team	W		L	PCT	W		L	PCT
No. 4 North Carolina†	11	–	5	.688	31	–	7	.816
Virginia	11	–	5	.688	21	–	11	.656
Virginia Tech	10	–	6	.625	22	–	12	.647
Boston College	10	–	6	.625	21	–	12	.636
No. 18 Maryland	10	–	6	.625	25	–	9	.735
Georgia Tech	8	–	8	.500	20	–	12	.625
Duke	8	–	8	.500	22	–	11	.667
Clemson	7	–	9	.438	25	–	11	.694
Florida State	7	–	9	.438	22	–	13	.629
NC State	5	–	11	.313	20	–	16	.556
Wake Forest	5	–	11	.313	15	–	16	.484
Miami (FL)	4	–	12	.250	12	–	20	.375
† 2007 ACC tournament winner Rankings from AP Poll

The 2006–07 Florida State Seminoles men's basketball team represented Florida State University in the 2006–07 NCAA Division I men's basketball season. The team was coached by Leonard Hamilton.

The Seminoles finished the season with a 22–13 record. They lost to North Carolina 73–58 in the ACC tournament 2nd round. Florida State lost to Mississippi State 86–71 in the NIT third round on March 20, 2007.
