= 2006–07 Atlantic Coast Conference men's basketball season =

- League: NCAA Division I
- Sport: Basketball
- Teams: 12
- TV partner(s): Raycom, ESPN

Regular season
- First place (tie): North Carolina (11–5); Virginia (11–5)
- Season MVP: Jared Dudley – Boston College

Tournament
- Champions: North Carolina (16th)
- Runners-up: North Carolina State
- Finals MVP: Brandan Wright – UNC

Basketball seasons
- ← 2005–06 2007–08 →

2006–07 ACC men's basketball standings
	Conf.				Overall
Team	W		L	PCT	W		L	PCT
No. 4 North Carolina†	11	–	5	.688	31	–	7	.816
Virginia	11	–	5	.688	21	–	11	.656
Virginia Tech	10	–	6	.625	22	–	12	.647
Boston College	10	–	6	.625	21	–	12	.636
No. 18 Maryland	10	–	6	.625	25	–	9	.735
Georgia Tech	8	–	8	.500	20	–	12	.625
Duke	8	–	8	.500	22	–	11	.667
Clemson	7	–	9	.438	25	–	11	.694
Florida State	7	–	9	.438	22	–	13	.629
NC State	5	–	11	.313	20	–	16	.556
Wake Forest	5	–	11	.313	15	–	16	.484
Miami (FL)	4	–	12	.250	12	–	20	.375
† 2007 ACC tournament winner Rankings from AP Poll

The 2007 ACC Men's Basketball Season began on November 7, 2006, in College Park, Maryland, USA. It started when Maryland played Hampton in a non-conference game. The conference schedule began on December 3, 2006, in Charlottesville, Virginia where Virginia defeated NC State 67–62. Following the season the 2007 ACC men's basketball tournament took place in Tampa, Florida with North Carolina claiming the crown.

== Final standings ==
Team	ACC Regular Season	ACC %	ACC Home	ACC Road	All Games	All Games %	All Home	All Road	All Neutral
North Carolina	11–5	.688	7–1	4–4	31–7	.816	16–1	6–4	9–2
Virginia	11–5	.688	8–0	3–5	21–11	.656	16–1	3–6	2–4
Maryland	10–6	.625	6–2	4–4	25–9	.735	17–2	5–4	3–3
Virginia Tech	10–6	.625	6–2	4–4	22–12	.647	13–2	5–5	4–5
Boston College	10–6	.625	6–2	4–4	21–12	.636	14–4	5–6	2–2
Duke	8–8	.500	4–4	4–4	22–11	.667	15–4	5–4	2–3
Georgia Tech	8–8	.500	7–1	1–7	20–12	.645	17–1	1–8	2–3
Clemson	7–9	.438	4–4	3–5	25–11	.694	16–4	6–5	3–2
Florida State	7–9	.438	5–3	2–6	22–13	.629	16–3	4–9	2–1
North Carolina State	5–11	.313	3–5	2–6	20–16	.556	14–6	3–8	3–2
Wake Forest	5–11	.313	4–4	1–7	15–16	.484	12–5	2–9	1–2
Miami	4–12	.250	3–5	1–7	12–20	.375	8–7	3–9	1–4

=== Notes ===
- UNC and UVA shared the regular season title.
- Teams tied in the standings are ranked by non-conference record.

== Statistical leaders ==
Points per game			Rebounds per game			Assists per game			Steals per game		
Player	School	PPG	Player	School	RPG	Player	School	APG	Player	School	SPG
Al Thornton	FSU	19.7	Jared Dudley	BC	8.3	Ishmael Smith	WF	6.0	Jamon Gordon	VT	2.8
Jared Dudley	BC	19.0	Tyler Hansbrough	UNC	7.9	Javaris Crittenton	GT	6.1	Zabian Dowdell	VT	2.1
Sean Singletary	UVA	19.0	Josh McRoberts	Duke	7.9	Ty Lawson	UNC	5.6	Javaris Crittenton	GT	2.0
Tyler Hansbrough	UNC	18.4	Ekene Ibekwe	MD	7.9	Tyrese Rice	BC	5.4	D. J. Strawberry	MD	2.0
J. R. Reynolds	UVA	18.4	Kyle Visser	WF	7.4	Sean Singletary	UVA	4.7	Vernon Hamilton	Clem.	1.9

Blocked shots per game			Field goal percentage			Three-point FG percentage			Free throw percentage		
Player	School	BPG	Player	School	FG%	Player	School	3FG%	Player	School	FT%
Ekene Ibekwe	MD	2.7	Brandan Wright	UNC	64.6	Jack McClinton	Mia.	44.0	Jack McClinton	Mia.	89.5
Josh McRoberts	Duke	2.5	Ben McCauley	NCSU	58.4				Sean Singletary	UVA	87.2
Trevor Booker	Clem.	2.2	Kyle Visser	WF	48.4				Jon Scheyer	Duke	84.6
James Gist	MD	2.1	Jared Dudley	BC	56.2				J. R. Reynolds	UVA	83.2
Tyrelle Blair	BC	2.1	Al Thornton	FSU	53.0				Zabian Dowdell	VT	80.6

== Players of the week ==
Throughout the conference season, the ACC offices name a player and rookie of the week. The MVP of the ACC tournament is the automatic winner of the final ACC player of the week of each season.

Week	Player of the week	Rookie of the week
November 13, 2006	Mamadi Diane, UVA	Ishmael Smith, WF
November 20, 2006	D. J. Strawberry, MD	Brandan Wright, UNC
November 27, 2006	Gavin Grant, NCSU	Brandan Wright, UNC
December 4, 2006	Jack McClinton, Mia.	Wayne Ellington, UNC
December 11, 2006	Jared Dudley, BC	Trevor Booker, Clem.
December 18, 2006	Mike Jones, MD	Brandan Wright, UNC
December 25, 2006	Jamon Gordon, VT	Jon Scheyer, Duke
January 2, 2007	Sean Singletary, UVA	Brandan Wright, UNC
January 2, 2007	Josh McRoberts, Duke	Brandan Wright, UNC
January 8, 2007	Sean Singletary, UVA	Brandan Wright, UNC
January 15, 2007	Zabian Dowdell, VT	Javaris Crittenton, GT
January 22, 2007	J. R. Reynolds, UVA	Jon Scheyer, Duke
January 22, 2007	J. R. Reynolds, UVA	Dwayne Collins, Mia.
January 29, 2007	Zabian Dowdell, VT	Ty Lawson, UNC
February 5, 2007	Jared Dudley, BC	Brandon Costner, NCSU
February 12, 2007	Jared Dudley, BC	Brandan Wright, UNC
February 12, 2007	Jared Dudley, BC	Javaris Crittenton, GT
February 19, 2007	D. J. Strawberry, MD	Greivis Vásquez, MD
February 26, 2007	D. J. Strawberry, MD	Jon Scheyer, Duke
March 5, 2007	Al Thornton, FSU	Javaris Crittenton, GT
March 12, 2007	Brandan Wright, UNC	None Selected

== ACC-Big Ten Challenge ==
November 27

- N.C. State 74, Michigan 67

November 28

- Maryland 72, Illinois 66
- Wisconsin 81, Florida State 66
- Georgia Tech 77, Penn State 73
- Duke 54, Indiana 51
- Northwestern 61, Miami 59

November 29

- Boston College 65, Michigan State 58
- Purdue 61, Virginia 59
- Virginia Tech 69, Iowa 65
- North Carolina 98, Ohio State 89
- Clemson 90, Minnesota 68
  - Wake Forest did not play.
  - ACC won 8–3

== Conference honors ==
ACC Conference awards were handed out at the conclusion of the regular season.

=== Player of the Year ===
Jared Dudley, Boston College

=== Rookie of the Year ===
Brandan Wright, North Carolina

=== Coach of the Year ===
Dave Leitao, Virginia

=== Defensive Player of the Year ===
Jamon Gordon, Virginia Tech

=== All-Atlantic Coast Conference ===
First Team

- Jared Dudley, Sr., Boston College
- Tyler Hansbrough, So., North Carolina
- Al Thornton, Sr., Florida State
- Sean Singletary, Jr., Virginia
- Zabian Dowdell, Sr., Virginia Tech

Second Team

- J. R. Reynolds, Sr., Virginia
- D. J. Strawberry, Sr., Maryland
- Tyrese Rice, So., Boston College
- Josh McRoberts, So., Duke
- Brandan Wright, Fr., North Carolina

Third Team

- Kyle Visser, Sr., Wake Forest
- Javaris Crittenton, Fr., Georgia Tech
- Brandon Costner, Fr., North Carolina State
- Jamon Gordon, Sr., Virginia Tech
- Jack McClinton, So., Miami

Honorable Mention: Ben McCauley, So., NCSU; James Mays, Jr., Clem.; DeMarcus Nelson, Jr., Duke; James Gist, Jr., MD; Ekene Ibekwe, Sr., MD

=== All-ACC Freshman team ===
- Brandan Wright, North Carolina
- Javaris Crittenton, Georgia Tech
- Brandon Costner, North Carolina State
- Jon Scheyer, Duke
- Ty Lawson, North Carolina

=== All-ACC Defensive team ===
- Jamon Gordon, Sr., Virginia Tech
- Zabian Dowdell, Sr., Virginia Tech
- Ekene Ibekwe, Sr., Maryland
- D. J. Strawberry, Sr., Maryland
- Josh McRoberts, So., Duke

== ACC tournament ==
See 2007 ACC men's basketball tournament

== Postseason ==
=== NCAA tournament ===
ACC Record: 7–7

1 North Carolina (3–1) – Elite Eight

W 16 Eastern Kentucky 86–65
W 9 Michigan State 81–67
W 5 USC 74–64
L 2 Georgetown 84–96 (OT)

4 Virginia (1–1)

W 13 Albany 84–57
L 5 Tennessee 74–77

4 Maryland (1–1)

W 13 Davidson 82–70
L 5 Butler 59–62

5 Virginia Tech (1–1)

W 12 Illinois 54–52
L 4 Southern Illinois 48–63

6 Duke (0–1)

L 11 Virginia Commonwealth 77–79

7 Boston College (1–1)

W 10 Texas Tech 84–75
L 2 Georgetown 55–62

10 Georgia Tech (0–1)

L 7 UNLV 63–67

=== NIT ===
ACC Record: 8–3

1 Clemson (4–1) – Runner-Up

W 8 East Tennessee State 64–57
W 4 Ole Miss 89–68
W 2 Syracuse 74–70
W 1 Air Force 68–67
L 1 West Virginia 73–78

2 Florida State (2–1)

W 7 Toledo 77–61
W 3 Michigan 87–66
L 1 Mississippi State 71–86

6 North Carolina State (2–1)

W 3 Drexel 63–56
W 7 Marist 69–62
L 1 West Virginia 66–71
