= 2006–07 Miami Hurricanes men's basketball team =

American college basketball season

2006–07 Miami Hurricanes men's basketball
- Conference: Atlantic Coast Conference
- Record: 12-20 (4-12 ACC)
- Head coach: Frank Haith
- Home arena: BankUnited Center

2006–07 ACC men's basketball standings
| | Conf. | | | | Overall |
| Team | W | | L | PCT | W | | L | PCT |
|---|---|---|---|---|---|---|---|---|
| No. 4 North Carolina† | 11 | – | 5 | .688 | 31 | – | 7 | .816 |
| Virginia | 11 | – | 5 | .688 | 21 | – | 11 | .656 |
| Virginia Tech | 10 | – | 6 | .625 | 22 | – | 12 | .647 |
| Boston College | 10 | – | 6 | .625 | 21 | – | 12 | .636 |
| No. 18 Maryland | 10 | – | 6 | .625 | 25 | – | 9 | .735 |
| Georgia Tech | 8 | – | 8 | .500 | 20 | – | 12 | .625 |
| Duke | 8 | – | 8 | .500 | 22 | – | 11 | .667 |
| Clemson | 7 | – | 9 | .438 | 25 | – | 11 | .694 |
| Florida State | 7 | – | 9 | .438 | 22 | – | 13 | .629 |
| NC State | 5 | – | 11 | .313 | 20 | – | 16 | .556 |
| Wake Forest | 5 | – | 11 | .313 | 15 | – | 16 | .484 |
| Miami (FL) | 4 | – | 12 | .250 | 12 | – | 20 | .375 |
† 2007 ACC tournament winner Rankings from AP Poll

The 2006–07 Miami Hurricanes men's basketball team represented the University of Miami during the 2006–07 NCAA Division I men's basketball season. The Hurricanes, led by head coach Frank Haith, played their home games at the BankUnited Center and were members of the Atlantic Coast Conference.

On December 30, 2006, the Hurricanes lost to Nebraska 82–67 in the Orange Bowl Basketball Classic.

They finished the season 12-20, and their season ended with a 74–71 overtime loss to Boston College in the ACC tournament on March 9, 2007.
