= 2006–07 Virginia Cavaliers men's basketball team =

American college basketball season

2006–07 Virginia Cavaliers men's basketball

ACC regular season co-champions

NCAA tournament, Round of 32
- Conference: Atlantic Coast Conference

Ranking
- Coaches: No. 24
- Record: 21–11 (11–5 ACC)
- Head coach: Dave Leitao (2nd season)
- Assistant coaches: Bill Courtney (2nd season); Rob Lanier (2nd season); Steve Seymour (2nd season)
- Home arena: John Paul Jones Arena

2006–07 ACC men's basketball standings
	Conf.				Overall
Team	W		L	PCT	W		L	PCT
No. 4 North Carolina†	11	–	5	.688	31	–	7	.816
Virginia	11	–	5	.688	21	–	11	.656
Virginia Tech	10	–	6	.625	22	–	12	.647
Boston College	10	–	6	.625	21	–	12	.636
No. 18 Maryland	10	–	6	.625	25	–	9	.735
Georgia Tech	8	–	8	.500	20	–	12	.625
Duke	8	–	8	.500	22	–	11	.667
Clemson	7	–	9	.438	25	–	11	.694
Florida State	7	–	9	.438	22	–	13	.629
NC State	5	–	11	.313	20	–	16	.556
Wake Forest	5	–	11	.313	15	–	16	.484
Miami (FL)	4	–	12	.250	12	–	20	.375
† 2007 ACC tournament winner Rankings from AP Poll

The 2006–07 Virginia Cavaliers men's basketball team represented the University of Virginia during the 2006–07 NCAA Division I men's basketball season. The team was led by second-year head coach Dave Leitao, and played their home games at John Paul Jones Arena in Charlottesville, Virginia as members of the Atlantic Coast Conference.

The Cavaliers began the season with the opening of the John Paul Jones Arena and an upset of then-#10 Arizona. Despite returning all five starters from the previous campaign, the Cavaliers were picked to finish 8th place in the conference. They went on to win a share of the ACC regular season championship with North Carolina and the second seed in the ACC tournament. Coach Dave Leitao was chosen as the ACC Coach of the Year following the conclusion of the regular season. Virginia received the fourth seed in the NCAA tournament's South Regional, where they beat Albany for their first NCAA tournament victory since 1995, but lost in the second round to fifth-seeded Tennessee.

== Roster ==
2006–07 Virginia Cavaliers men's basketball team
Players
Coaches

Pos.	#	Name	Height	Weight	Year	Previous school	Hometown
G/F	1	Will Harris	6 ft 6 in (1.98 m)	230 lb (104 kg)	Fr	Brewster Academy	Corona, NY
G	2	J. R. Reynolds (C)	6 ft 2.5 in (1.89 m)	188 lb (85 kg)	Sr	Oak Hill Academy	Roanoke, VA
G	4	Calvin Baker (redshirt)	6 ft 2 in (1.88 m)	180 lb (82 kg)	So	Woodside/William & Mary	Newport News, VA
F	11	Laurynas Mikalauskas	6 ft 8 in (2.03 m)	255 lb (116 kg)	So	Blue Ridge School	Palanga, Lithuania
F	12	Jamil Tucker	6 ft 8 in (2.03 m)	230 lb (104 kg)	Fr	West Side	Gary, IN
G	15	Damin Altizer	5 ft 11 in (1.8 m)	162 lb (73 kg)	So	Bath County	Millboro, VA
C	21	Tunji Soroye	6 ft 11 in (2.11 m)	245 lb (111 kg)	Jr	Montrose Christian	Dugbe Ibadan, Nigeria
G/F	24	Mamadi Diane	6 ft 5 in (1.96 m)	197 lb (89 kg)	So	DeMatha Catholic	Potomac, MD
G	25	David Noel	6 ft 3 in (1.91 m)	195 lb (88 kg)	Fr	St. John's	Houston, TX
F	30	Adrian Joseph	6 ft 7 in (2.01 m)	205 lb (93 kg)	Jr	Brewster Academy	San Fernando, Trinidad
F	31	Andy Burns	6 ft 8 in (2.03 m)	202 lb (92 kg)	Fr	Bishop Ireton	Alexandria, VA
F	33	Jason Cain	6 ft 10 in (2.08 m)	225 lb (102 kg)	Sr	John Bartram	Philadelphia, PA
F/C	34	Ryan Pettinella	6 ft 9 in (2.06 m)	238 lb (108 kg)	Jr	McQuaid Jesuit	Webster, NY
F	35	Bob McCormick	6 ft 5 in (1.96 m)	214 lb (97 kg)	So	Francis W. Parker	Chicago, IL
G	44	Sean Singletary (C)	6 ft 0 in (1.83 m)	185 lb (84 kg)	Jr	William Penn Charter School	Philadelphia, PA
G/F	45	Solomon Tat	6 ft 5 in (1.96 m)	220 lb (100 kg)	Fr	Community Christian	Jos Plateau, Nigeria
F/C	55	Jerome Meyinsse	6 ft 8 in (2.03 m)	230 lb (104 kg)	Fr	McKinley	Baton Rouge, LA

Head coach

- Dave Leitao (Northeastern)

Assistant coach(es)

- Rob Lanier (St. Bonaventure)
- Steve Seymour (Bridgewater State)
- Bill Courtney (Bucknell)

Legend

- (C) Team captain
- (S) Suspended
- (I) Ineligible
- (W) Walk-on
- Injured
- Current redshirt

Roster
Last update: 11 December 2014

== Schedule ==
Date time, TV	Rank^{#}	Opponent^{#}	Result	Record	Site (attendance) city, state
Exhibition game
Nov. 4*; 7:00 pm		Augusta State	W 78–63		John Paul Jones Arena (2,485); Charlottesville, VA
Regular season
Nov. 12*; 7:00 pm, FSN		No. 10 Arizona	W 93–90	1–0	John Paul Jones Arena (15,219); Charlottesville, VA
Nov. 19*; 7:00 pm		Morgan State	W 85–66	2–0	John Paul Jones Arena (11,005); Charlottesville, VA
Nov. 22*; 3:00 pm		UNC Asheville	W 81–64	3–0	John Paul Jones Arena (10,811); Charlottesville, VA
Nov. 26*; 7:00 pm		Maryland–Eastern Shore	W 104–63	4–0	John Paul Jones Arena (10,104); Charlottesville, VA
Nov. 29*; 3:00 pm, ESPN2	No. 25	at Purdue; ACC/Big 10 Challenge	L 59–61	4–1	Mackey Arena (11,534); West Lafayette, IN
Dec. 3; 7:30 pm, FSN	No. 25	NC State	W 67–62	5–1 (1–0)	John Paul Jones Arena (14,569); Charlottesville, VA
Dec. 16*; 3:30p		Hampton	W 91–69	6–1	John Paul Jones Arena (12,217); Charlottesville, VA
Dec. 19*; 2:00 pm		vs. Appalachian State; San Juan Shootout	L 69–80	6–2	Mario Morales Coliseum; San Juan, PR
Dec. 20* noon		vs. Utah; San Juan Shootout	L 70–94	6–3	Mario Morales Coliseum; San Juan, PR
Dec. 21*; 10:00 am		vs. Puerto Rico–Mayagüez; San Juan Shootout	W 59–52	7–3	Mario Morales Coliseum; San Juan, PR
Dec. 28*; 7:30 pm		American	W 91–70	8–3	John Paul Jones Arena (13,126); Charlottesville, VA
Jan. 3*; 9:00 pm, ESPN2		Gonzaga	W 108–87	9–3	John Paul Jones Arena (13,827); Charlottesville, VA
Jan. 7*; 5:00 pm, FSN		Stanford	L 75–76	9–4	John Paul Jones Arena (13,846); Charlottesville, VA
Jan. 10; 9:00 pm, RLF		at No. 1 North Carolina	L 69–79	9–5 (1–1)	Dean Smith Center (21,569); Chapel Hill, NC
Jan. 13; 2:00 pm, RLF		at Boston College	L 73–78	9–6 (1–2)	Conte Forum (8,606); Chestnut Hill, MA
Jan. 16; 8:00 pm, RLF		Maryland	W 103–91	10–6 (2–2)	John Paul Jones Arena (14,765); Charlottesville, VA
Jan. 21; 1:00 pm, RLF		Wake Forest	W 88–76	11–6 (3–2)	John Paul Jones Arena (14,564); Charlottesville, VA
Jan. 24; 9:00 pm, RLF		at NC State	W 71–58	12–6 (4–2)	PNC Arena (15,233); Raleigh, NC
Jan. 28; 1:00 pm, RLF		at No. 19 Clemson	W 64–63	13–6 (5–2)	Littlejohn Coliseum (8,728); Clemson, SC
Feb. 1; 9:00 pm, ESPN		No. 8 Duke	W 68–66 ^{OT}	14–6 (6–2)	John Paul Jones Arena (15,169); Charlottesville, VA
Feb. 3; 8:00 pm, ESPNU		Miami	W 81–70	15–6 (7–2)	John Paul Jones Arena (14,856); Charlottesville, VA
Feb. 6; 9:00 pm, RSN		at Maryland	W 69–65	16–6 (8–2)	Comcast Center (17,950); College Park, MD
Feb. 10; 4:00 pm, RLF		at No. 21 Virginia Tech	L 57–84	16–7 (8–3)	Cassell Coliseum (9,847); Blacksburg, VA
Feb. 13*; 7:00 pm		Longwood	W 90–49	17–7	John Paul Jones Arena (11,666); Charlottesville, VA
Feb. 17; 1:00 pm, RLF		Florida State	W 73–70	18–7 (9–3)	John Paul Jones Arena (14,619); Charlottesville, VA
Feb. 21; 7:30 pm	No. 24	at Miami	L 60–68	18–8 (9–4)	BankUnited Center (3,707); Miami, FL
Feb. 24; 3:30 pm, ABC	No. 24	Georgia Tech	W 75–69	19–8 (10–4)	John Paul Jones Arena (14,654); Charlottesville, VA
Mar. 1; 7:00 pm, ESPN		Virginia Tech	W 69–56	20–8 (11–4)	John Paul Jones Arena (14,931); Charlottesville, VA
Mar. 3; 1:00 pm, RLF		at Wake Forest	L 72–78	20–9 (11–5)	LJVM Coliseum (13,611); Winston-Salem, NC
ACC Tournament
Mar. 9; 7:00 pm, RLF/ESPN2		vs. NC State; ACC Tournament quarterfinals	L 71–79	20–10	St. Pete Times Forum (22,269); Tampa, FL
NCAA tournament
Mar. 16*; 12:15 pm, CBS	No. (4 S)	vs. No. (13 S) Albany; First Round	W 84–57	21–10	Nationwide Arena; Columbus, OH
Mar. 18*; 12:10 pm, CBS	No. (4 S)	vs. No. (5 S) Tennessee; Second Round	L 74–77	21–11	Nationwide Arena; Columbus, OH
*Non-conference game. ^{#}Rankings from AP Poll. (#) Tournament seedings in parentheses. All times are in Eastern Time.
