= 2006–07 Boston College Eagles men's basketball team =

American college basketball season

2006–07 Boston College Eagles men's basketball
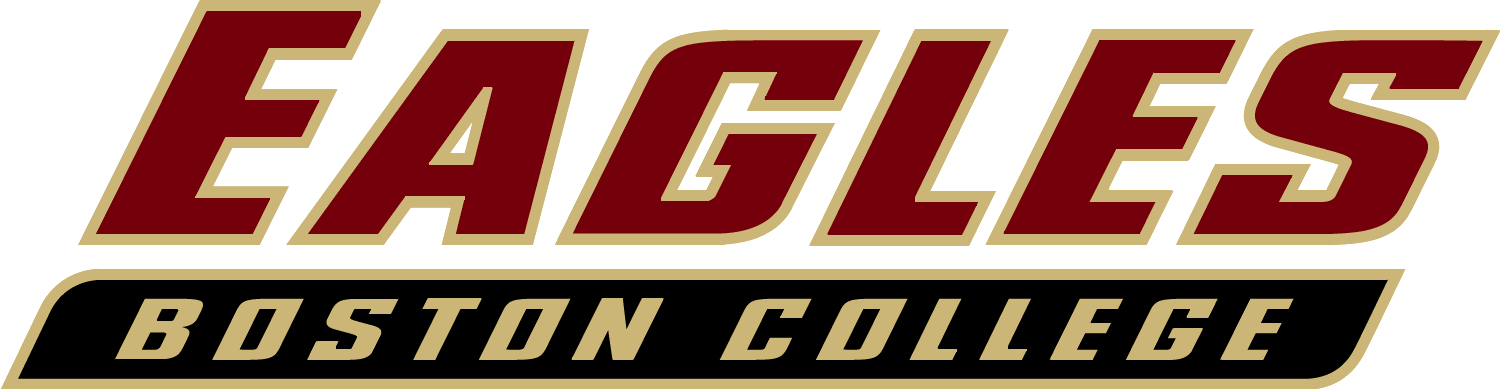

NCAA tournament, Second round
- Conference: Atlantic Coast Conference
- Record: 22–12 (10–6 ACC)
- Head coach: Al Skinner (10th season)
- Home arena: Conte Forum

2006–07 ACC men's basketball standings
	Conf.				Overall
Team	W		L	PCT	W		L	PCT
No. 4 North Carolina†	11	–	5	.688	31	–	7	.816
Virginia	11	–	5	.688	21	–	11	.656
Virginia Tech	10	–	6	.625	22	–	12	.647
Boston College	10	–	6	.625	21	–	12	.636
No. 18 Maryland	10	–	6	.625	25	–	9	.735
Georgia Tech	8	–	8	.500	20	–	12	.625
Duke	8	–	8	.500	22	–	11	.667
Clemson	7	–	9	.438	25	–	11	.694
Florida State	7	–	9	.438	22	–	13	.629
NC State	5	–	11	.313	20	–	16	.556
Wake Forest	5	–	11	.313	15	–	16	.484
Miami (FL)	4	–	12	.250	12	–	20	.375
† 2007 ACC tournament winner Rankings from AP Poll

The 2006–07 Boston College Eagles men's basketball team played college basketball for the Boston College Eagles in the Atlantic Coast Conference. In 2005–06, they went 28–8 (11–5 ACC).

== Roster ==
2006–07 Boston College Eagles men's basketball team
Players
Coaches

Pos.	#	Name	Height	Weight	Year	Previous school	Hometown
G	0	MarQuez Haynes	6 ft 3 in (1.91 m)	185 lb (84 kg)	So	Irving HS	Irving, Texas
F	3	Jared Dudley	6 ft 7 in (2.01 m)	225 lb (102 kg)	Sr	Horizon HS	San Diego, California
G	4	Tyrese Rice	6 ft 1 in (1.85 m)	190 lb (86 kg)	So	L. C. Bird HS	Richmond, Virginia
G	5	Daye Kaba	6 ft 4 in (1.93 m)	215 lb (98 kg)	Fr	Our Savior New American HS	Ridge, New York
F	5	Akida McLain	6 ft 8 in (2.03 m)	220 lb (100 kg)	Jr	Penn Hills HS	Pittsburgh, Pennsylvania
F	21	Tyler Roche	6 ft 7 in (2.01 m)	218 lb (99 kg)	Fr	Manchester Central HS	Hooksett, New Hampshire
G	23	Sean Marshall	6 ft 6 in (1.98 m)	212 lb (96 kg)	Sr	Eisenhower HS	Rialto, California
F	32	John Oates	6 ft 10 in (2.08 m)	255 lb (116 kg)	Jr	Don Bosco Prep	Harriman, New York
F	34	Shamari Spears	6 ft 6 in (1.98 m)	245 lb (111 kg)	Fr	Blair Academy	Salisbury, North Carolina
C	44	Tyrelle Blair	6 ft 11 in (2.11 m)	230 lb (104 kg)	Sr	Florida State University School	Monticello, Florida
F/C	51	Sean Williams	6 ft 10 in (2.08 m)	235 lb (107 kg)	Jr	Mansfield HS	Houston, Texas

Head coach

- Al Skinner

Assistant coach(es)

Legend

- (C) Team captain
- (S) Suspended
- (I) Ineligible
- (W) Walk-on
- Injured
- Current redshirt

Roster

== Schedule and results ==
Date time, TV	Rank^{#}	Opponent^{#}	Result	Record	Site city, state
Regular Season
ACC Tournament
Mar 9, 2007*		vs. Miami (FL); Quarterfinals	W 74–71 ^{OT}	20–10	St. Pete Times Forum; Tampa, Florida
Mar 10, 2007*		vs. No. 8 North Carolina; Semifinals	L 56–71	20–11	St. Pete Times Forum; Tampa, Florida
NCAA Tournament
Mar 15, 2007*		vs. Texas Tech; First Round	W 84–75	21–11	Lawrence Joel Coliseum; Winston-Salem, North Carolina
Mar 17, 2007*		vs. No. 8 Georgetown; Second Round	L 55–62	21–12	Lawrence Joel Coliseum; Winston-Salem, North Carolina
*Non-conference game. ^{#}Rankings from AP Poll. (#) Tournament seedings in parentheses.
