= 2006–07 Virginia Tech Hokies men's basketball team =

American college basketball season

2006–07 Virginia Tech Hokies men's basketball

NCAA Tournament, Round of 32
- Conference: Atlantic Coast Conference

Ranking
- Coaches: No. 25
- Record: 22–12 (10–6 ACC)
- Head coach: Seth Greenberg (4th season)
- Assistant coaches: Brad Greenberg; Ryan Odom; Stacey Palmore
- Home arena: Cassell Coliseum

2006–07 ACC men's basketball standings
	Conf.				Overall
Team	W		L	PCT	W		L	PCT
No. 4 North Carolina†	11	–	5	.688	31	–	7	.816
Virginia	11	–	5	.688	21	–	11	.656
Virginia Tech	10	–	6	.625	22	–	12	.647
Boston College	10	–	6	.625	21	–	12	.636
No. 18 Maryland	10	–	6	.625	25	–	9	.735
Georgia Tech	8	–	8	.500	20	–	12	.625
Duke	8	–	8	.500	22	–	11	.667
Clemson	7	–	9	.438	25	–	11	.694
Florida State	7	–	9	.438	22	–	13	.629
NC State	5	–	11	.313	20	–	16	.556
Wake Forest	5	–	11	.313	15	–	16	.484
Miami (FL)	4	–	12	.250	12	–	20	.375
† 2007 ACC tournament winner Rankings from AP Poll

The 2006–07 Virginia Tech Hokies men's basketball team is an NCAA Division I college basketball team that competed in the Atlantic Coast Conference, finishing the regular season as the third place team in the conference. This season saw the Hokies make their first NCAA Tournament appearance since 1996.

During the 2006–2007 regular season, Virginia Tech beat Duke at Cameron Indoor Stadium and also swept North Carolina defeating the top-ranked team both in Blacksburg, VA and their home court in Chapel Hill, NC, although losing 3 times in a row to NC State including a loss ending their ACC tournament run.

== Roster ==
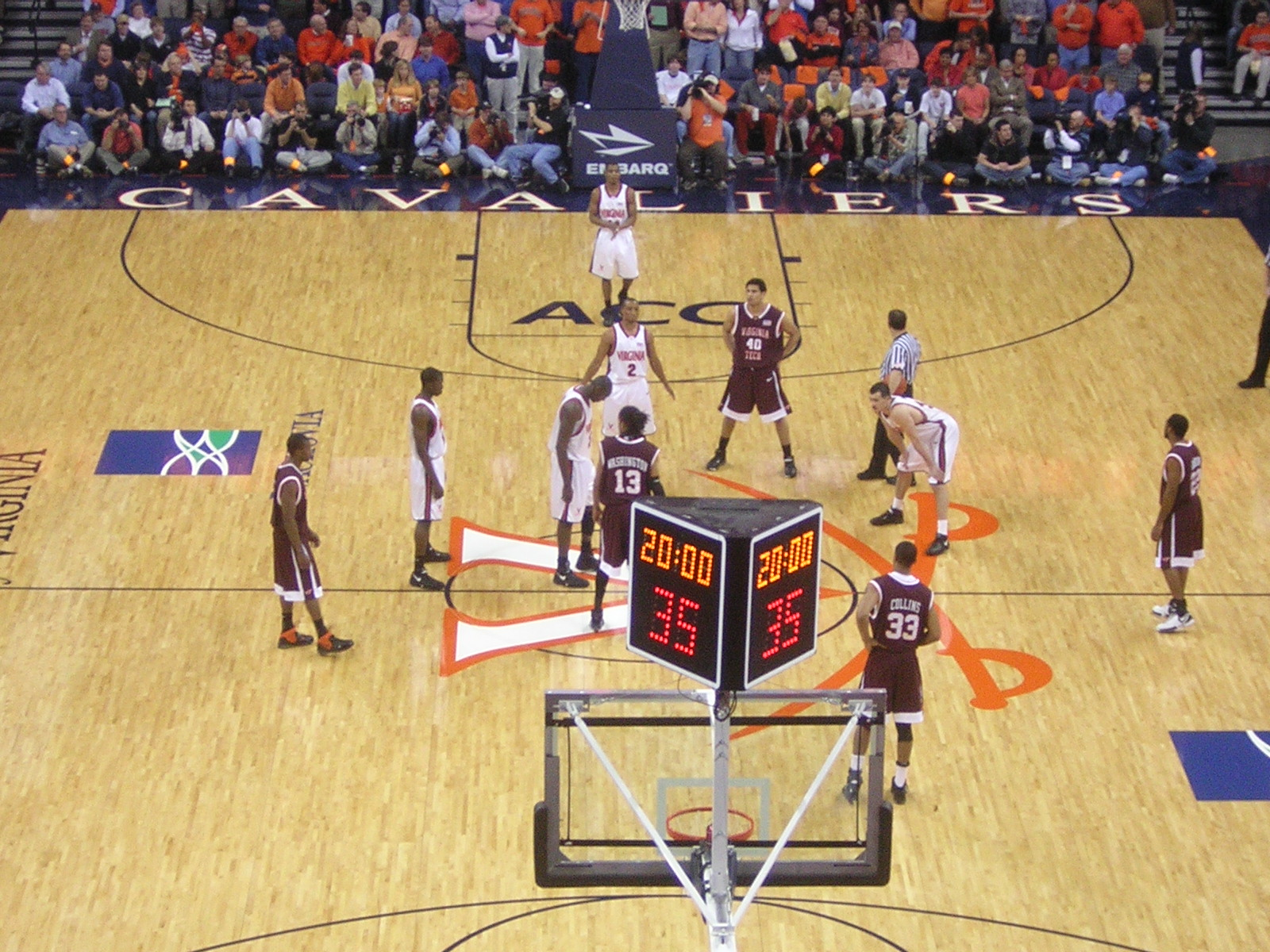
Virginia Tech's basketball team just before tip-off of their March 1, 2007 game against Virginia

2006–07 Virginia Tech Hokies men's basketball team
Players
Coaches

Pos.	#	Name	Height	Weight	Year	Previous school	Hometown
G	1	Zabian Dowdell	6 ft 3 in (1.91 m)	200 lb (91 kg)	Sr	Pahokee	Pahokee, Florida
G	3	Nigel Munson	6 ft 0 in (1.83 m)	175 lb (79 kg)	Fr	DeMatha	Washington, D.C.
G/F	13	Deron Washington	6 ft 7 in (2.01 m)	205 lb (93 kg)	Jr	National Christian Academy	New Orleans, Louisiana
F/C	14	Robert Krabbendam	7 ft 0 in (2.13 m)	240 lb (109 kg)	RS So	Copernicus	Hoorn, The Netherlands
F	15	Terrance Vinson	6 ft 8 in (2.03 m)	230 lb (104 kg)	RS Fr	Lowndes	Valdosta, Georgia
F	21	Lewis Witcher	6 ft 9 in (2.06 m)	220 lb (100 kg)	Fr	Franklin County	Rocky Mount, Virginia
G	22	Jamon Gordon	6 ft 3 in (1.91 m)	215 lb (98 kg)	RS Sr	Andrew Jackson	Jacksonville, Florida
G	23	Marcus Travis	6 ft 3 in (1.91 m)	210 lb (95 kg)	Jr	Blacksburg/Oxnard JC	Blacksburg, Virginia
G	24	Markus Sailes	6 ft 5 in (1.96 m)	210 lb (95 kg)	RS Sr	Varina	Richmond, Virginia
F	33	Coleman Collins	6 ft 9 in (2.06 m)	240 lb (109 kg)	Sr	Chamblee	Stone Mountain, Georgia
F	34	Cheick Diakite	6 ft 9 in (2.06 m)	230 lb (104 kg)	So	Bridgton Academy	Bamako, Mali
G/F	40	A. D. Vassallo	6 ft 6 in (1.98 m)	215 lb (98 kg)	So	Hargrave Military Academy	Toa Baja, Puerto Rico
F	42	Chris Tucker	6 ft 6 in (1.98 m)	220 lb (100 kg)	Sr	Lord Botetourt/Fork Union	Fincastle, Virginia

Head coach

- Seth Greenberg (Fairleigh Dickinson)

Assistant coach(es)

- Brad Greenberg (American)
- Ryan Odom (Hampden–Sydney)
- Stacey Palmore (Livingstone)

Legend

- (C) Team captain
- (S) Suspended
- (I) Ineligible
- (W) Walk-on
- Injured
- Current redshirt

Roster

== 2006–2007 schedule and results ==
Date	Opponent	Location	Result	Overall	Conf.
**Regular Season**
November 10, 2006	Coppin State	Blacksburg, VA	**W** 94–43	1–0	0–0
November 14, 2006	West Florida	Blacksburg, VA	**W** 95–47	2–0	0–0
November 23, 2006	Western Michigan^{1}	Orlando, FL	**L** 68–71	2–1	0–0
November 24, 2006	Montana^{1}	Orlando, FL	**W** 77–56	3–1	0–0
November 26, 2006	Southern Illinois^{1}	Orlando, FL	**L** 64–69	3–2	0–0
November 29, 2006	Iowa^{2}	Blacksburg, VA	**W** 59–55	4–2	0–0
December 3, 2006	George Washington^{3}	Washington, DC	**L** 62–63	4–3	0–0
December 6, 2006	Old Dominion	Blacksburg, VA	**W** 72–55	5–3	0–0
December 10, 2006	Appalachian State	Blacksburg, VA	**W** 69–37	6–3	0–0
December 17, 2006	**Wake Forest**	Blacksburg, VA	**W** 63–60	7–3	1–0
December 21, 2006	Seton Hall^{4}	New York, NY	**W** 80–61	8–3	1–0
December 23, 2006	Campbell	Blacksburg, VA	**W** 94–70	9–3	1–0
December 30, 2006	Marshall	Huntington, WV	**L** 58–59	9–4	1–0
January 3, 2007	Richmond	Blacksburg, VA	**W** 65–53	10–4	1–0
January 6, 2007	**Duke**	Durham, NC	**W** 69–67 (OT)	11–4	2–0
January 10, 2007	UNC Greensboro	Greensboro, NC	**W** 74–51	12–4	2–0
January 13, 2007	**North Carolina**	Blacksburg, VA	**W** 94–88	13–4	3–0
January 17, 2007	**Florida State**	Tallahassee, FL	**L** 73–82	13–5	3–1
January 21, 2007	**Maryland**	Blacksburg, VA	**W** 67–64 (OT)	14–5	4–1
January 23, 2007	**Miami**	Miami, FL	**W** 92–85	15–5	5–1
January 28, 2007	**Georgia Tech**	Atlanta, GA	**W** 73–65	16–5	6–1
January 31, 2007	**NC State**	Blacksburg, VA	**L** 59–70	16–6	6–2
February 3, 2007	**Boston College**	Chestnut Hill, MA	**L** 59–80	16–7	6–3
February 10, 2007	**Virginia**	Blacksburg, VA	**W** 84–57	17–7	7–3
February 13, 2007	**North Carolina**	Chapel Hill, NC	**W** 81–80 (OT)	18–7	8–3
February 18, 2007	**NC State**	Raleigh, NC	**L** 56–81	18–8	8–4
February 21, 2007	**Boston College**	Blacksburg, VA	**W** 79–62	19–8	9–4
February 24, 2007	**Miami**	Blacksburg, VA	**W** 73–57	20–8	10–4
March 1, 2007	**Virginia**	Charlottesville, VA	**L** 56–69	20–9	10–5
March 4, 2007	**Clemson**	Blacksburg, VA	**L** 74–75	20–10	10–6
**ACC tournament**
March 9, 2007	Wake Forest	Tampa, FL	**W** 71–52	21–10	
March 10, 2007	NC State	Tampa, FL	**L** 64–72	21–11	
**NCAA tournament**
March 16, 2007	Illinois	Columbus, OH	**W** 54–52	22–11	
March 16, 2007	Southern Illinois	Columbus, OH	**L** 48–63	22–12	
*Conference games in **bold**. ^{1}Old Spice Classic, ^{2}ACC-Big Ten Challenge, ^{3}BB&T Classic, ^{4}Aeropostale Classic
