= Southwest Atlanta Christian Academy =

Location
- 3911 Campbellton Rd., S.W. Atlanta, Georgia 30331; United States

Information
- Type: Private, day, college preparatory school
- Religious affiliation: Christian
- Established: 1986
- Headmistress Emeritus: Geraldine G. Thompson
- Grades: PK–12
- Gender: Coeducational
- Student to teacher ratio: 15:1
- Colors: Maroon & Gray
- Athletics conference: Georgia High School Association
- Mascot: Warrior
- Team name: Warriors
- Accreditation: Georgia Accrediting Commission
- Athletic Director: Naomi Thompson

Southwest Atlanta Christian Academy (SACA) is a private Christian school in southwestern Atlanta, Georgia, United States. Geraldine Thompson is the headmistress and is the wife to Pastor Wayne C. Thompson. Pastor Thompson is the founder of Southwest Atlanta Christian Academy. The school is affiliated with Fellowship of Faith Church in East Point.

The school is home to the 2006 double GHSA Class A State Champions, Saca Warriors and Lady Warriors.

== Notable alumni ==
- Javaris Crittenton (Class of 2006) - former Los Angeles Lakers player, former Washington Wizards player and convicted killer
- Dwight Howard (Class of 2004) - Los Angeles Lakers player, NBA Champion (2020), 3-time NBA Defensive Player of the Year (2009–11)
