= 2006–07 Duke Blue Devils men's basketball team =

American college basketball season

2006–07 Duke Blue Devils men's basketball

NCAA tournament, Round of 64
- Conference: Atlantic Coast Conference
- Record: 22–11 (8–8 ACC)
- Head coach: Mike Krzyzewski (27th season)
- Home arena: Cameron Indoor Stadium

2006–07 ACC men's basketball standings
	Conf.				Overall
Team	W		L	PCT	W		L	PCT
No. 4 North Carolina†	11	–	5	.688	31	–	7	.816
Virginia	11	–	5	.688	21	–	11	.656
Virginia Tech	10	–	6	.625	22	–	12	.647
Boston College	10	–	6	.625	21	–	12	.636
No. 18 Maryland	10	–	6	.625	25	–	9	.735
Georgia Tech	8	–	8	.500	20	–	12	.625
Duke	8	–	8	.500	22	–	11	.667
Clemson	7	–	9	.438	25	–	11	.694
Florida State	7	–	9	.438	22	–	13	.629
NC State	5	–	11	.313	20	–	16	.556
Wake Forest	5	–	11	.313	15	–	16	.484
Miami (FL)	4	–	12	.250	12	–	20	.375
† 2007 ACC tournament winner Rankings from AP Poll

The 2006–07 Duke Blue Devils men's basketball team represented Duke University. The head coach was Mike Krzyzewski, serving for his 27th year. The team played its home games in Cameron Indoor Stadium in Durham, North Carolina.

Duke lost to VCU in the first round of the NCAA tournament.

== Recruiting ==
College recruiting
Name	Hometown	School	Height	Weight	Commit date
Gerald Henderson, Jr. SF	Merion, Pennsylvania	Episcopal Academy	6 ft 4 in (1.93 m)	215 lb (98 kg)	May 18, 2005
Gerald Henderson, Jr. SF	Recruit ratings: Scout: Rivals: (N/A)				
Jon Scheyer; SG	Northbrook, Illinois	Glenbrook North High School	6 ft 5 in (1.96 m)	190 lb (86 kg)	May 17, 2005
Jon Scheyer; SG	Recruit ratings: Scout: Rivals: (N/A)				
Lance Thomas; PF	Scotch Plains, New Jersey	St. Benedict's Prep	6 ft 8 in (2.03 m)	225 lb (102 kg)	May 4, 2006
Lance Thomas; PF	Recruit ratings: Scout: Rivals: (N/A)				
Brian Zoubek; C	Haddonfield, New Jersey	Haddonfield Memorial High School	7 ft 1 in (2.16 m)	260 lb (120 kg)	May 17, 2005
Brian Zoubek; C	Recruit ratings: Scout: Rivals: (N/A)				
Overall recruit ranking: Scout: 4 Rivals: 5 ESPN: N/A
Note: In many cases, Scout, Rivals, 247Sports, On3, and ESPN may conflict in their listings of height and weight.; In these cases, the average was taken. ESPN grades are on a 100-point scale.; Sources: "Duke Basketball Commitments". Rivals.; "2006 Duke Basketball Commits". Scout.; "ESPN". ESPN.; "Scout.com Team Recruiting Rankings". Scout.; "2006 Team Ranking". Rivals.

== Roster ==
Name	Number	Position	Height	Weight	Year	Hometown
Jordan Davidson	12	Point guard	6–1	180	Sophomore	Melbourne, Arkansas
Gerald Henderson, Jr.	15	Shooting guard	6–4	215	Freshman	Merion, Pennsylvania
Steve Johnson	51	Small forward	6–6	205	Freshman	Colorado Springs, Colorado
David McClure	14	Small forward	6–6	200	Sophomore	Ridgefield, Connecticut
Josh McRoberts	2	Power forward	6–10	240	Sophomore	Carmel, Indiana
DeMarcus Nelson(c)	21	Point guard	6–4	200	Junior	Elk Grove, California
Joe Pagliuca	45	Point guard	6–2	185	Senior	Weston, Massachusetts
Greg Paulus	3	Point guard	6–1	180	Sophomore	Syracuse, New York
Martynas Pocius	5	Shooting guard	6–5	190	Sophomore	Vilnius, Lithuania
Jon Scheyer	30	Shooting guard	6–5	180	Freshman	Northbrook, Illinois
Nick Sutton	13	Point guard	6–2	180	Freshman	Kentfield, California
Lance Thomas	42	Small forward	6–8	215	Freshman	Scotch Plains, New Jersey
Griffin Tormey	40	Point guard	5–11	165	Sophomore	Chicago, Illinois
Brian Zoubek	55	Center	7–1	260	Freshman	Haddonfield, New Jersey

== Schedule ==
Date time, TV	Rank^{#}	Opponent^{#}	Result	Record	Site (attendance) city, state
Regular season
November 12, 2006*; 8:30 pm, ESPNU	No. 12	Columbia; CBE Classic	W 86–43	1–0	Cameron Indoor Stadium (9,314); Durham, NC
November 13, 2006*; 7:00 pm, ESPN2	No. 12	Georgia Southern; CBE Classic	W 86–61	2–0	Cameron Indoor Stadium (9,314); Durham, NC
November 16, 2006*; 7:00 pm, ACC Select	No. 11	UNC Greensboro	W 75–48	3–0	Cameron Indoor Stadium (9,314); Durham, NC
November 20, 2006*; 7:00 pm, ESPN2	No. 11	vs. Air Force; CBE Classic	W 71–56	4–0	Municipal Auditorium (7,063); Kansas City, MO
November 21, 2006*; 10:20 pm, ESPN2	No. 9	vs. No. 13 Marquette; CBE Classic	L 62–73	4–1	Municipal Auditorium (8,381); Kansas City, MO
November 25, 2006*; 7:00 pm, FSN	No. 9	Davidson	W 75–47	5–1	Cameron Indoor Stadium (9,314); Durham, NC
November 28, 2006*; 9:00 pm, ESPN	No. 11	Indiana; ACC–Big Ten Challenge	W 54–51	6–1	Cameron Indoor Stadium (9,314); Durham, NC
December 2, 2006*; 7:00 pm, ESPN2	No. 11	No. 18 Georgetown	W 61–52	7–1	Cameron Indoor Stadium (9,314); Durham, NC
December 6, 2006*; 7:00 pm, ESPN2	No. 7	Holy Cross	W 57–45	8–1	Cameron Indoor Stadium (9,314); Durham, NC
December 9, 2006*; 12:00 pm, ESPN	No. 7	George Mason	W 69–53	9–1	Cameron Indoor Stadium (9,314); Durham, NC
December 19, 2006*; 7:00 pm, ESPN	No. 6	Kent State	W 79–72	10–1	Cameron Indoor Stadium (9,314); Durham, NC
December 21, 2006*; 9:00 pm, ESPN2	No. 6	vs. No. 22 Gonzaga; Aeropostate Classic	W 61–54	11–1	Madison Square Garden (19,528); New York, NY
December 31, 2006*; 1:00 pm, FSN	No. 5	San Jose State	W 70–51	12–1	Cameron Indoor Stadium (9,314); Durham, NC
January 2, 2007*; 7:00 pm, ESPN2	No. 5	Temple	W 73–55	13–1	Cameron Indoor Stadium (9,314); Durham, NC
January 6, 2007; 12:00 pm, ESPN	No. 5	Virginia Tech	L 67–69 ^{OT}	13–2 (0–1)	Cameron Indoor Stadium (9,314); Durham, NC
January 10, 2007; 7:00 pm, ESPN	No. 11	at Georgia Tech	L 63–74	13–3 (0–2)	Alexander Memorial Coliseum (9,191); Atlanta, GA
January 14, 2007; 5:30 pm, FSN	No. 11	at Miami (FL)	W 86–63	14–3 (1–2)	BankUnited Center (6,211); Coral Gables, FL
January 18, 2007; 7:00 pm, ESPN	No. 14	Wake Forest	W 62–40	15–3 (2–2)	Cameron Indoor Stadium (9,314); Durham, NC
January 20, 2007; 3:30 pm, ABC	No. 14	at North Carolina State	W 79–56	16–3 (3–2)	RBC Center (19,700); Raleigh, NC
January 25, 2007; 7:00 pm, ESPN	No. 10	No. 19 Clemson	W 68–66	17–3 (4–2)	Cameron Indoor Stadium (9,314); Durham, NC
January 28, 2007; 5:30 pm, FSN	No. 10	Boston College	W 75–61	18–3 (5–2)	Cameron Indoor Stadium (9,314); Durham, NC
February 1, 2007; 9:00 pm, ESPN	No. 8	at Virginia	L 66–68	18–4 (5–3)	John Paul Jones Arena (15,169); Charlottesville, VA
February 4, 2007; 2:00 pm, FSN	No. 8	Florida State	L 67–68	18–5 (5–4)	Cameron Indoor Stadium (9,314); Durham, NC
February 7, 2007; 9:00 pm, ESPN	No. 16	No. 5 North Carolina	L 73–79	18–6 (5–5)	Cameron Indoor Stadium (9,314); Durham, NC
February 11, 2007; 5:00 pm, FSN	No. 16	at Maryland	L 60–72	18–7 (5–6)	Comcast Center (17,950); College Park, MD
February 14, 2007; 9:00 pm, ESPN		at No. 21 Boston College	W 78–70	19–7 (6–6)	Conte Forum (8,606); Chestnut Hill, MA
February 18, 2007; 1:00 pm, CBS		Georgia Tech	W 71–62	20–7 (7–6)	Cameron Indoor Stadium (9,314); Durham, NC
February 22, 2007; 9:00 pm, ESPN	No. 18	at Clemson	W 71–66	21–7 (8–6)	Littlejohn Coliseum (10,000); Clemson, SC
February 25, 2007*; 2:00 pm, CBS	No. 18	at St. John's	W 67–50	22–7	Madison Square Garden (17,283); New York, NY
February 28, 2007; 9:00 pm, ESPN	No. 14	No. 24 Maryland	L 77–85	22–8 (8–7)	Cameron Indoor Stadium (9,314); Durham, NC
March 4, 2007; 4:00 pm, CBS	No. 14	at No. 8 North Carolina	L 72–86	22–9 (8–8)	Dean Smith Center (21,750); Chapel Hill, NC
ACC Tournament
March 8, 2007; 7:00 pm, ESPN2	No. 21	vs. NC State; ACC Tournament First Round	L 80–85 ^{OT}	22–10	St. Pete Times Forum (22,269); Tampa, FL
NCAA tournament
March 15, 2007*; 7:00 pm, CBS	No. (6)	vs. No. (11) VCU; NCAA tournament first round	L 77–79	22–11	HSBC Arena (18,843); Buffalo, NY
*Non-conference game. ^{#}Rankings from AP Poll. (#) Tournament seedings in parentheses.
