= 2007 ACC men's basketball tournament =

- 2007 ACC Tournament logo
- Classification: Division I
- Season: 2006–07
- Teams: 12
- Site: St. Pete Times Forum; Tampa, Florida
- Champions: North Carolina (16th title)
- Winning coach: Roy Williams (1st title)
- MVP: Brandan Wright (North Carolina)

The 2007 Atlantic Coast Conference men's basketball tournament took place from March 8 to 11 in Tampa, Florida, at the St. Pete Times Forum, the first time the tournament was held in Florida. The quarterfinal games were televised nationwide on ESPN2. Semifinals and the championship game were televised on ESPN. The tournament was also televised by Raycom Sports in ACC markets. For the first time ever, Raycom broadcast the tournament in high definition.

The top four regular season teams (North Carolina, Virginia, Virginia Tech, and Boston College) received first-round byes and played their first games in the quarterfinals. Both North Carolina and Virginia finished the regular season tied for first place with an 11–5 record, but North Carolina received the #1 seed by virtue of the head-to-head tiebreaker.

All four opening-round games were won by the lower seeds. This tournament was the lowest Duke had been seeded (seventh) in the ACC Tournament since 1995, when they were the ninth seed. Their on-court struggles were compounded by the suspension of freshman Gerald Henderson. By defeating Duke, NC State ended Duke's 8-year domination of the ACC Tournament. Prior to this loss, Duke was 23–1 in ACC Tournament play over the previous 8 years, losing only the 2004 finals to Maryland. The 2007 final round was identical to the final round of the Women's ACC Tournament, with North Carolina beating NC State for the title.

The 2007 tournament marked the first time a 10th seed won a game in an ACC tournament, much less three in a row (although 12th seed Wake Forest won two games in the 2006 Tournament). It was the second time a team has played 4 games (NC State in 1997), and the first time a team seeded as low as 10 reached the championship game. Previously the lowest seed to reach the title game was #8 seed NC State in 1997, when the conference had nine members.

By winning the ACC championship, North Carolina received an automatic bid to the NCAA tournament. North Carolina's Brandan Wright won the tournament's Most Valuable Player award.

2006–07 ACC men's basketball standings
	Conf.				Overall
Team	W		L	PCT	W		L	PCT
No. 4 North Carolina†	11	–	5	.688	31	–	7	.816
Virginia	11	–	5	.688	21	–	11	.656
Virginia Tech	10	–	6	.625	22	–	12	.647
Boston College	10	–	6	.625	21	–	12	.636
No. 18 Maryland	10	–	6	.625	25	–	9	.735
Georgia Tech	8	–	8	.500	20	–	12	.625
Duke	8	–	8	.500	22	–	11	.667
Clemson	7	–	9	.438	25	–	11	.694
Florida State	7	–	9	.438	22	–	13	.629
NC State	5	–	11	.313	20	–	16	.556
Wake Forest	5	–	11	.313	15	–	16	.484
Miami (FL)	4	–	12	.250	12	–	20	.375
† 2007 ACC tournament winner Rankings from AP Poll

== Bracket ==
First round March 8, 2007
8	Clemson	66
9	Florida State	67
5	#17 Maryland	62
12	Miami	67
7	#21 Duke	80
10	NC State	85^{OT}
6	Georgia Tech	112
11	Wake Forest	114^{2OT}

Quarterfinals; March 9, 2007
1	#8 North Carolina	73
9	Florida State	58
4	Boston College	74^{OT}
12	Miami	71
2	Virginia	71
10	NC State	79
3	Virginia Tech	71
11	Wake Forest	52

Semifinals; March 10, 2007
1	#8 North Carolina	71
4	Boston College	56
10	NC State	72
3	Virginia Tech	64

Championship Game; March 11, 2007
1	#8 North Carolina	89
10	NC State	80

AP Rankings at time of tournament
