= 2006–07 Georgia Tech Yellow Jackets men's basketball team =

American college basketball season

2006–07 Georgia Tech Yellow Jackets men's basketball

1st Round ACC vs Wake Forest, L, 114-112

Round of 64 vs UNLV, L, 67-63
- Conference: Atlantic Coast Conference
- Coastal
- Record: 20–12 (8–9 ACC)
- Head coach: Paul Hewitt (7th season)
- Assistant coaches: John O'Connor; Charlton Young; Peter Zaharis
- Home arena: Alexander Memorial Coliseum

2006–07 ACC men's basketball standings
	Conf.				Overall
Team	W		L	PCT	W		L	PCT
No. 4 North Carolina†	11	–	5	.688	31	–	7	.816
Virginia	11	–	5	.688	21	–	11	.656
Virginia Tech	10	–	6	.625	22	–	12	.647
Boston College	10	–	6	.625	21	–	12	.636
No. 18 Maryland	10	–	6	.625	25	–	9	.735
Georgia Tech	8	–	8	.500	20	–	12	.625
Duke	8	–	8	.500	22	–	11	.667
Clemson	7	–	9	.438	25	–	11	.694
Florida State	7	–	9	.438	22	–	13	.629
NC State	5	–	11	.313	20	–	16	.556
Wake Forest	5	–	11	.313	15	–	16	.484
Miami (FL)	4	–	12	.250	12	–	20	.375
† 2007 ACC tournament winner Rankings from AP Poll

The 2006–07 Georgia Tech Yellow Jackets men's basketball team represented the Georgia Institute of Technology in the 2006–07 college basketball season as a member of the Atlantic Coast Conference (ACC). The team was led by 7th-year head coach Paul Hewitt. Georgia Tech finished with a 20–12 record, and made the NCAA tournament, where they were defeated by UNLV.

== Pre-season ==
Paul Hewitt recruited one of the best recruiting classes in Georgia Tech history bringing in McDonald's All-Americans forward Thaddeus Young and guard Javaris Crittenton. The team returned Jeremis Smith, Anthony Morrow, Mario West, and Ra'Sean Dickey as veterans.

== Roster ==
Name	Number	Position	Height	Weight	Year	Hometown
Javaris Crittenton	1	G	6-5	198	Freshman	Atlanta, Georgia
Matt Causey	2	G	6-0	186	Senior	Gainesville, Georgia
Ra'Sean Dickey	4	F-C	6-10	250	Junior	Clio, South Carolina
Mario West	5	G	6-5	210	RS-Senior	Douglasville, Georgia
Mouhammad Faye	11	G-F	6-10	208	RS-Freshman	Dakar, Senegal
Paco Diaw	12	G	6-6	185	Sophomore	Dakar, Senegal
D'Andre Bell	13	G-F	6-5	210	Sophomore	Los Angeles, California
Ty Anderson	14	G	6-4	197	Freshman	Watkinsville, Georgia
Anthony Morrow	23	G	6-5	210	Junior	Charlotte, North Carolina
Jeremis Smith	32	F	6-8	236	Junior	Fort Worth, Texas
Thaddeus Young	33	F	6-8	217	Freshman	Memphis, Tennessee
Brad Sheehan	34	F-C	6-11	220	Freshman	Latham, New York
Zach Peacock	35	F	6-8	235	Freshman	Miami, Florida
Alade Aminu	41	F	6-10	225	Sophomore	Stone Mountain, Georgia

== Schedule and results ==
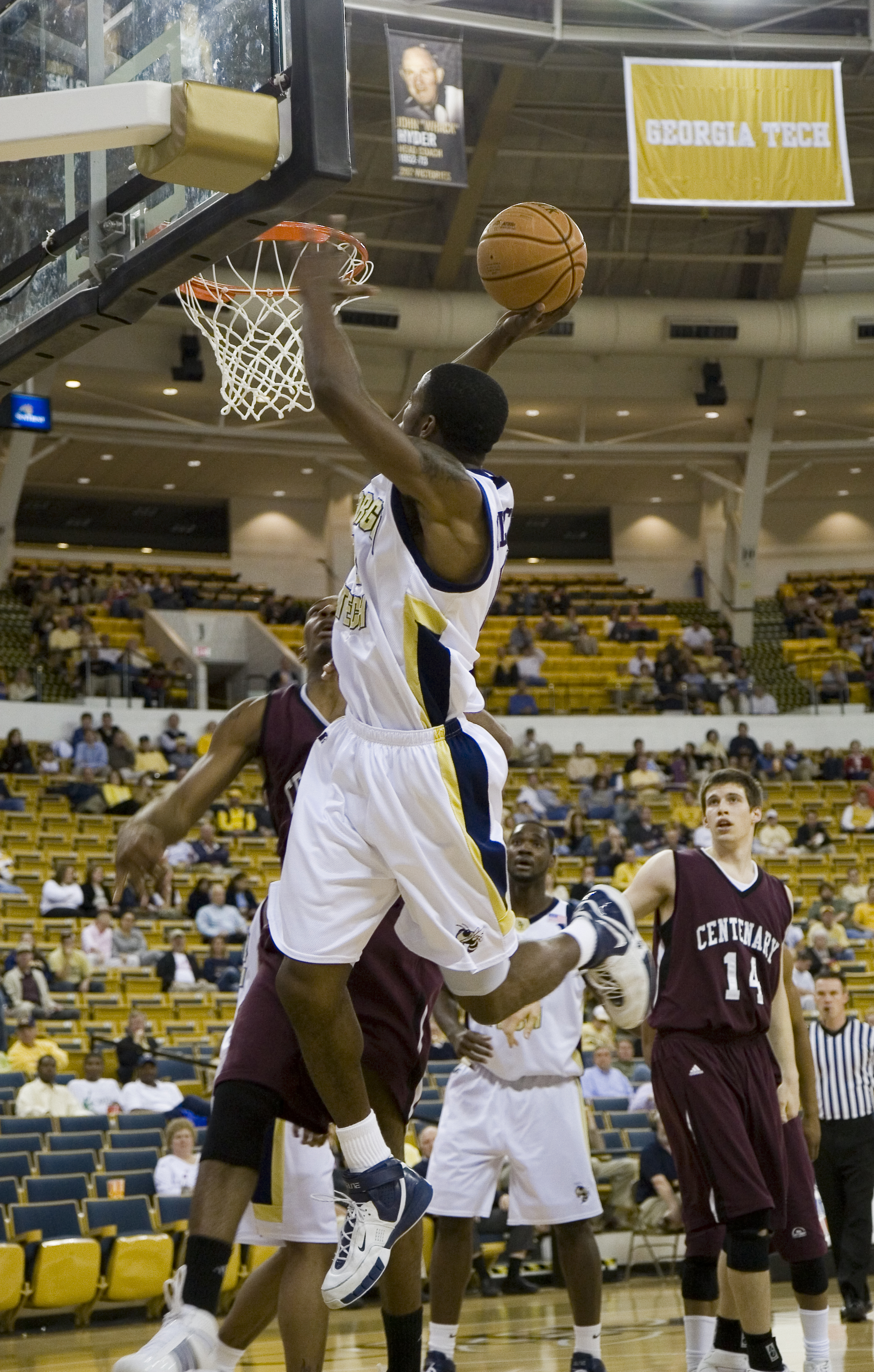
Lewis Clinch making a slam dunk vs. Centenary

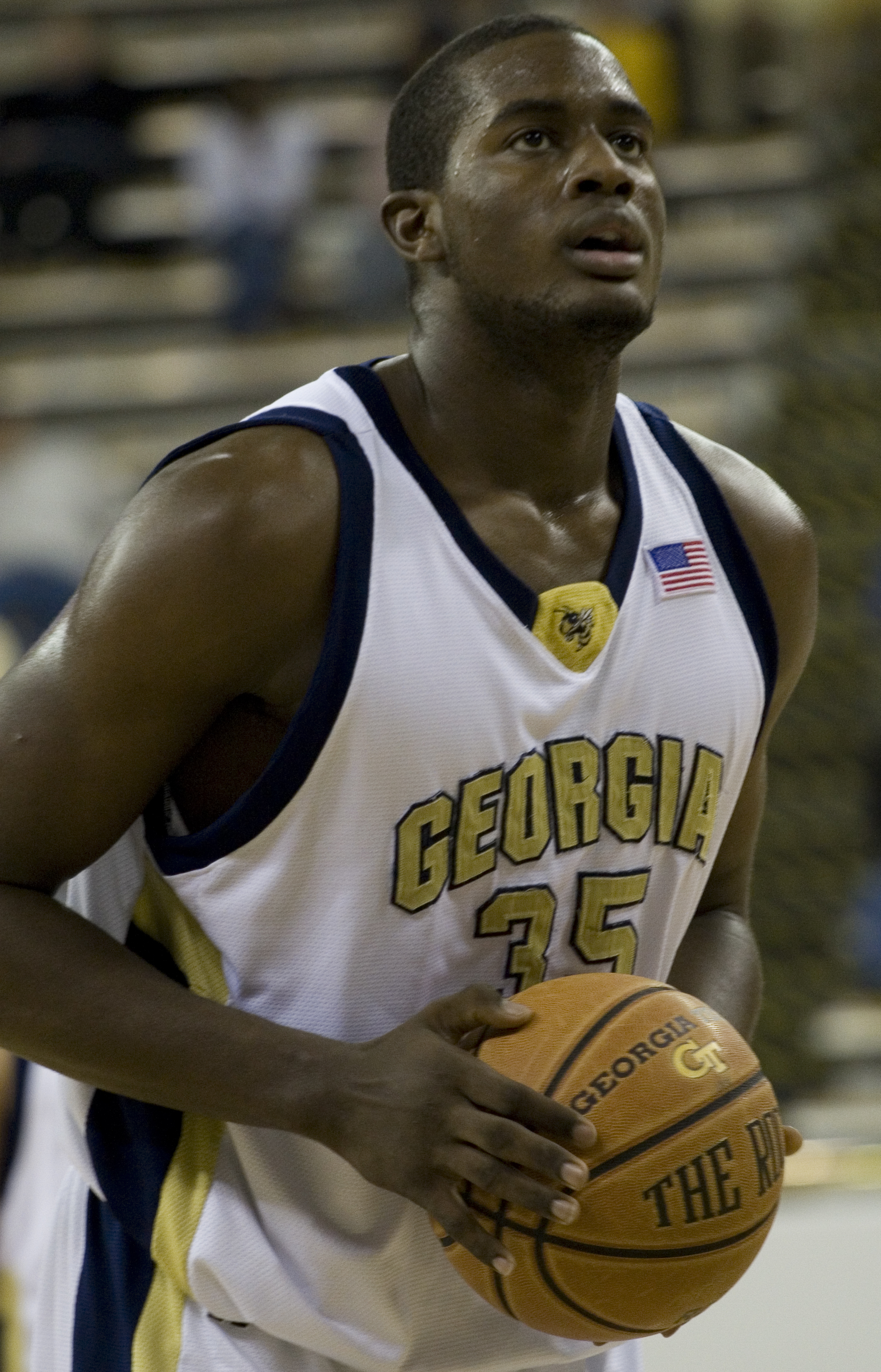
Zach Peacock attempting a free throw

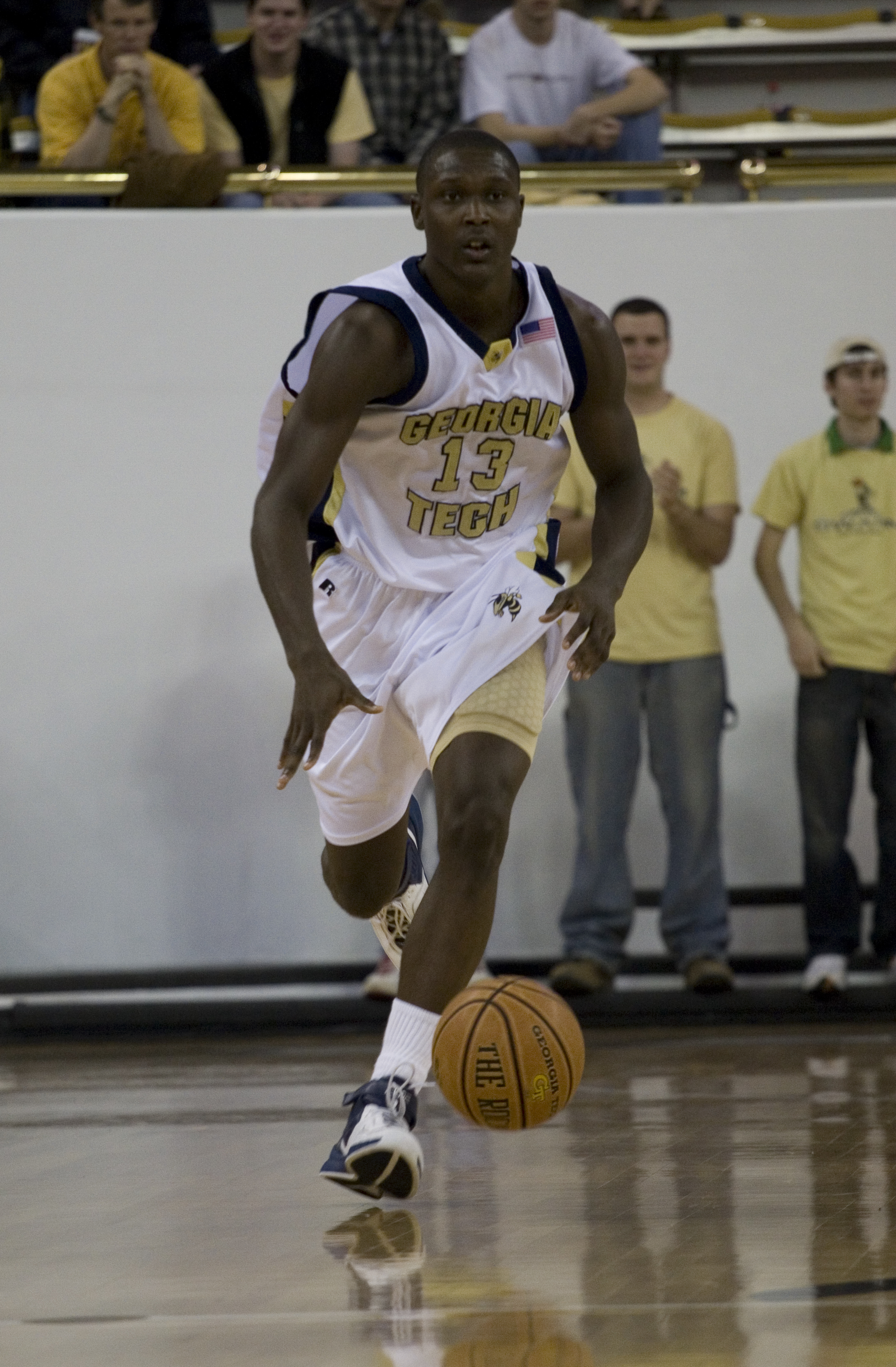
D'Andre Bell dribbling the ball

Date	Opponent	Location	Time (EST)	Result	Overall	Conf.	Recap
**Exhibition Games**
November 4, 2006	Morehouse	Atlanta, GA	4:00 PM	**W** 96-52			
**Regular Season**
November 10, 2006	Elon	Atlanta, GA	8:00 PM	**W** 83-49	1-0	0-0	
November 13, 2006	Jackson State	Atlanta, GA	7:00 PM	**W** 100-70	2-0	0-0	
November 16, 2006	Georgia State	Atlanta, GA	6:00 PM	**W** 103-74	3-0	0-0	
November 20, 2006	Purdue^{1}	Maui, HI	5:00 PM	**W** 79-61	4-0	0-0	
November 21, 2006	#12 Memphis^{1}	Maui, HI	7:00 PM	**W** 92-85	5-0	0-0	
November 22, 2006	#5 UCLA^{1}	Maui, HI	10:00 PM	**L** 88-73	5-1	0-0	
November 28, 2006	Penn State²	Atlanta, GA	8:00 PM	**W** 77-73	6-1	0-0	
December 3, 2006	**Miami**	Coral Gables, FL	5:30 PM	**L** 90-82	6-2	0-1	
December 9, 2006	Vanderbilt	Nashville, TN	5:00 PM	**L** 73-64	6-3	0-1	
December 18, 2006	Centenary	Atlanta, GA	7:00 PM	**W** 92-52	7-3	0-1	
December 22, 2006	Georgia (Clean, Old-Fashioned Hate)	Atlanta, GA	7:00 PM	**W** 78-69	8-3	0-1	
December 28, 2006	Troy	Atlanta, GA	2:00 PM	**W** 85-55	9-3	0-1	
December 30, 2006	St. Francis (PA)	Atlanta, GA	8:00 PM	**W** 87-43	10-3	0-1	
January 3, 2007	Winston-Salem St.	Atlanta, GA	7:00 PM	**W** 97-46	11-3	0-1	
January 6, 2007	#23 **Clemson**	Clemson, SC	4:00 PM	**L** 75-74	11-4	0-2	
January 10, 2007	#11 **Duke**	Atlanta, GA	7:00 PM	**W** 74-63	12-4	1-2	
January 13, 2007	**Florida St.**	Atlanta, GA	6:00 PM	**W** 88-80	13-4	2-2	
January 20, 2007	#4 **North Carolina**	Chapel Hill, NC	9:00 PM	**L** 77-61	13-5	2-3	
January 24, 2007	**Maryland**	College Park, MD	9:00 PM	**L** 80-65	13-6	2-4	
January 28, 2007	#24 **Virginia Tech**	Atlanta, GA	3:30 PM	**L** 73-65	13-7	2-5	
January 30, 2007	**Wake Forest**	Winston-Salem, NC	8:00 PM	**L** 85-75	13-8	2-6	
February 3, 2007	**Clemson**	Atlanta, GA	1:00 PM	**W** 80-62	14-8	3-6	
February 6, 2007	**NC State**	Atlanta, GA	7:00 PM	**W** 74-65	15-8	4-6	
February 11, 2007	UConn³	Atlanta, GA	1:00 PM	**W** 65-52	16-8	4-6	
February 13, 2007	**Florida St.**	Tallahassee, FL	8:00 PM	**W** 63-57	17-8	5-6	
February 18, 2007	**Duke**	Durham, NC	1:00 PM	**L** 71-62	17-9	5-7	
February 21, 2007	**Wake Forest**	Atlanta, GA	7:00 PM	**W** 75-61	18-9	6-7	
February 24, 2007	#24 **Virginia**	Charlottesville, VA	3:30 PM	**L** 73-69	18-10	6-8	
March 1, 2007	#8 **North Carolina**	Atlanta, GA	9:00 PM	**W** 84-77	19-10	7-8	
March 4, 2007	**Boston College**	Atlanta, GA	3:30 PM	**W** 74-60	20-10	8-8	
**ACC Tournament**
March 8, 2007	**Wake Forest**	Tampa, FL	9:00 PM	**L** 114-112	20-11	8-9	
**NCAA Tournament**
March 16, 2007	UNLV	Chicago, IL	12:25 PM	**L** 67-63	20-12	8-9	
*Conference games in **bold**. ^{1}EA Sports Maui Invitational, ²ACC–Big Ten Challenge game, ³Georgia Dome. AP Rankings use.
