= Javaris Crittenton =

American basketball player (born 1987)

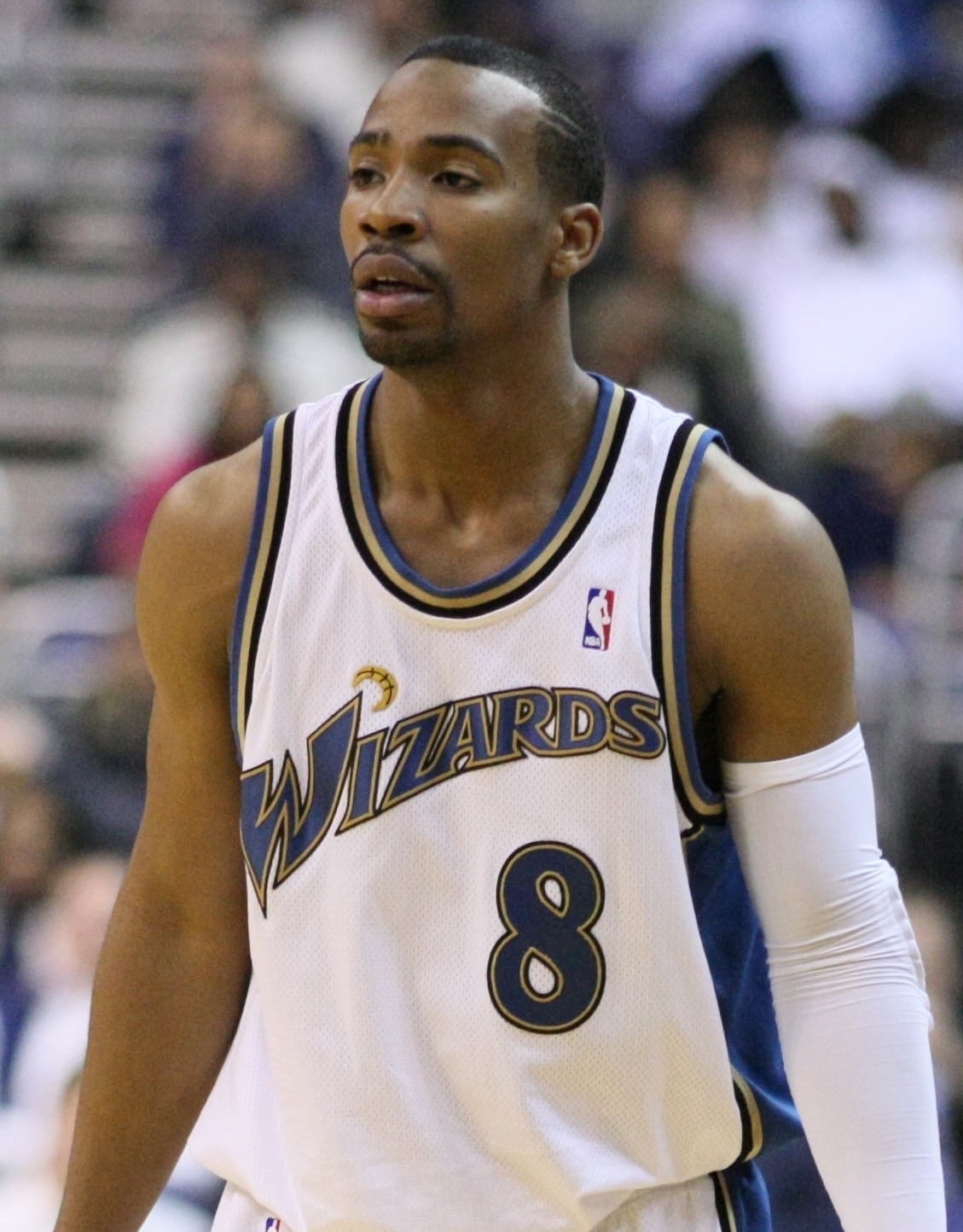
- Crittenton with the Washington Wizards in 2009

Personal information
- Born: December 31, 1987 (age 38) Atlanta, Georgia, U.S.
- Listed height: 6 ft 5 in (1.96 m)
- Listed weight: 200 lb (91 kg)

Career information
- High school: Southwest Atlanta Christian Academy (Atlanta, Georgia)
- College: Georgia Tech (2006–2007)
- NBA draft: 2007: 1st round, 19th overall pick
- Drafted by: Los Angeles Lakers
- Playing career: 2007–2011
- Position: Point guard / shooting guard
- Number: 1, 3, 8, 23, 6

Career history
- 2007–2008: Los Angeles Lakers
- 2008: Memphis Grizzlies
- 2008–2009: Washington Wizards
- 2010: Zhejiang Lions
- 2011: Dakota Wizards

Career highlights
- Third-team All-ACC (2007); ACC All-Freshman Team (2007); McDonald's All-American (2006); Third-team Parade All-American (2006); Mr. Georgia Basketball (2006)

Career statistics
- Points: 595 (5.3 ppg)
- Rebounds: 276 (2.4 rpg)
- Assists: 201 (1.8 apg)
- Stats at NBA.com
- Stats at Basketball Reference

Javaris Cortez Crittenton (born December 31, 1987) is an American former professional basketball player. During his four year career, Crittenton played for the Los Angeles Lakers, Memphis Grizzlies, and Washington Wizards of the National Basketball Association (NBA), the Zhejiang Lions of the Chinese Basketball Association, and the Dakota Wizards of the NBA D-League. He played college basketball for the Georgia Tech Yellow Jackets.

On August 26, 2011, Crittenton was charged with the murder of Jullian Jones, a 22-year-old mother of four. After pleading guilty to manslaughter in 2015, he was sentenced to 23 years in prison, though it was later reduced to 10 years. He was released from prison on April 21, 2023.

== Early life ==
Crittenton was born to Sonya Dixon in Atlanta, Georgia. He attended Southwest Atlanta Christian Academy, where, as a high school sophomore, he played alongside Dwight Howard, who was a senior at the time. Crittenton and Howard led Southwest Atlanta to victory in the GHSA class A state championship that season. As a junior, in 2005, Crittenton averaged 28.4 points, 7.5 assists, and 8.2 rebounds. He once again led Southwest Atlanta to the GHSA class A state finals, where they lost to powerhouse Randolph-Clay. As a senior, Crittenton averaged 29 points, 9 assists and 7 rebounds, and led Southwest Atlanta to the GHSA class A semi-finals against Randolph-Clay. After dismissing Randolph-Clay they headed to the championship game once again. This time they were successful in beating rivals Whitefield Academy to become state champions. Following the season he was named a McDonald's All American. He was also named Mr. Georgia Basketball by The Atlanta Journal-Constitution. Crittenton carried a 3.5 GPA in high school, and was a member of the Future Business Leaders of America and the Senior Beta Club.

== College career ==
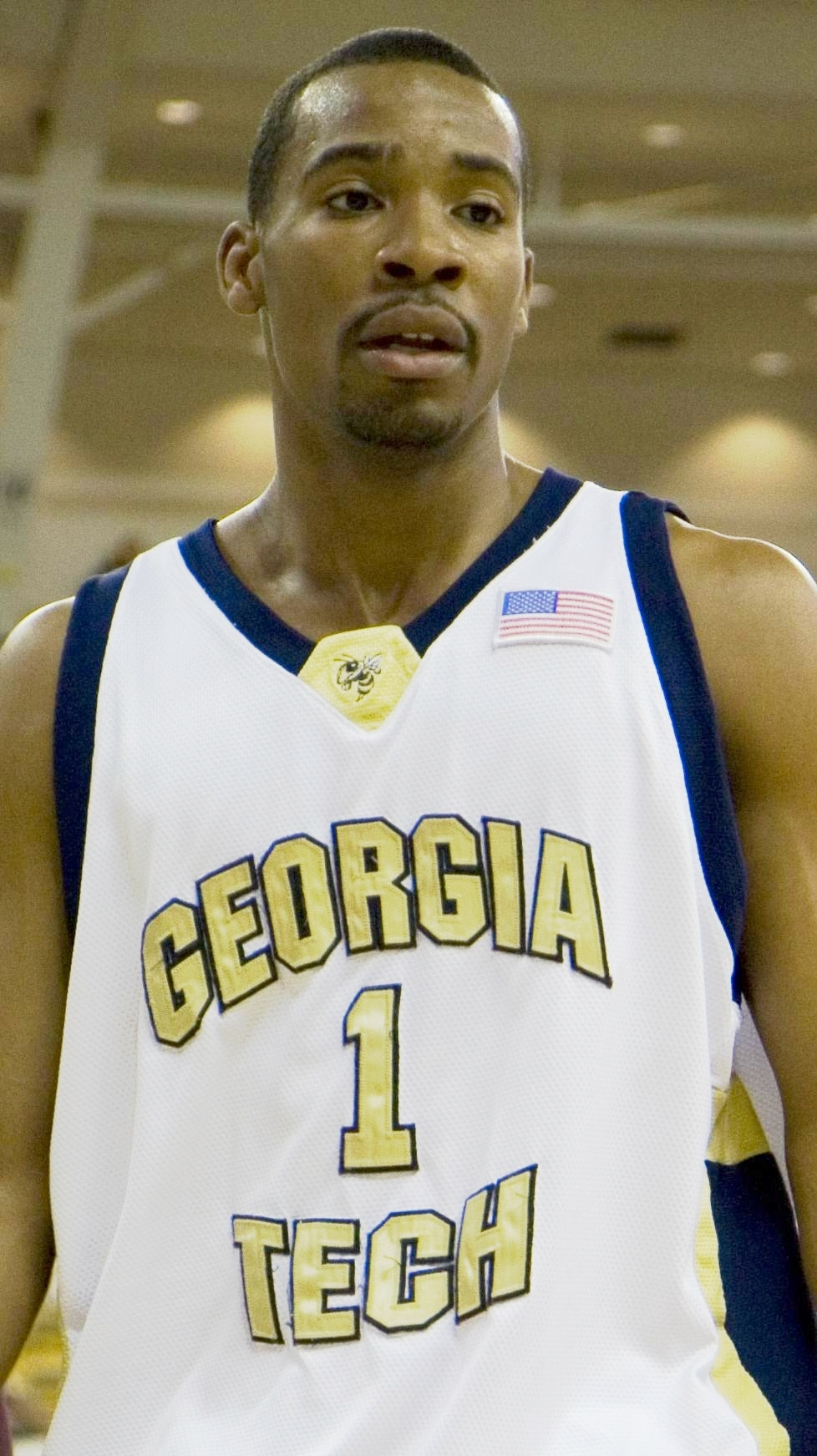
Crittenton with the Georgia Tech Yellow Jackets in 2006

While at Georgia Tech, Crittenton excelled and was considered a team leader, a rare accolade for a freshman. Tech coach Paul Hewitt urged Crittenton to take over a leadership role on the team after his play in several games in February 2007. He recorded a career high of 29 points in a February 13 game against Florida State. After a single season, he left school to go pro.

== Professional career ==
=== Los Angeles Lakers (2007–2008) ===
Crittenton was drafted with the 19th pick in the first round of the 2007 NBA draft by the Los Angeles Lakers. During an NBA Summer League game on July 8, 2007, he had 18 points, including a game winning jump-shot with 1.6 seconds left in the game. In the Lakers' first preseason game against the Golden State Warriors in Honolulu, Crittenton had 18 points along with one assist in a 111–110 loss.

=== Memphis Grizzlies (2008) ===
On February 1, 2008, Crittenton was traded to the Memphis Grizzlies along with Kwame Brown, Aaron McKie, rights to Marc Gasol and 2008 and 2010 first round draft picks for Pau Gasol and a 2010 second round draft pick. On April 2, 2008, Crittenton had a career high of 23 points in a 130–114 win over the New York Knicks.

=== Washington Wizards (2008–2009) ===
On December 10, 2008, Crittenton was part of a three-team trade that sent him to the Washington Wizards along with Mike James from the New Orleans Hornets. In exchange, the Wizards sent a conditional first-round draft pick to the Memphis Grizzlies and Antonio Daniels to the Hornets.

On December 21, 2009, Crittenton and teammate Gilbert Arenas were involved in a locker room confrontation involving unloaded guns. In a 2010 interview, former Washington Wizards teammate Caron Butler stated that "you never know, and that's the crazy thing about it" when questioned if there was going to be a trigger pulled in the incident between Crittenton and Arenas. On January 25, 2010, Crittenton pleaded guilty and was given a year of probation on a misdemeanor gun possession charge stemming from this incident. Two days later, Crittenton and Arenas were suspended for the rest of the season by NBA commissioner David Stern. He was released by the Wizards following the suspension, while Arenas rejoined the team.

=== Zhejiang Guangsha Lions (2010) ===
On September 22, 2010, the Charlotte Bobcats signed Crittenton to a non-guaranteed contract. They released him three weeks later on October 15.

In December 2010, Crittenton played five games for the Zhejiang Guangsha Lions of the Chinese Basketball Association. He averaged 25.8 points per game, but he returned to the United States after just a few weeks.

=== Dakota Wizards (2011) ===
In February 2011, Crittenton joined the Dakota Wizards of the NBA D-League. He played 21 games for the minor league team, including five starts. This is the last professional team he played for before later being arrested in 2011 for manslaughter charges.

== Murder and drug charges ==
Javaris Crittenton
- Convictions: Voluntary manslaughter with a weapon Aggravated assault with a firearm
- Penalty: 23 years in prison (reduced to 10 years)
- Capture status: Free

Details
- Victims: Jullian Jones
- Date: August 19, 2011

On August 26, 2011, Crittenton was charged with the August 19 murder of Jullian Jones, a 22-year-old mother of four. Atlanta Police Department indicated that Jones was not the intended target; they believed that Crittenton was targeting a person who robbed him in April 2011. Jones was shot in the leg and died during surgery. Crittenton was arrested by the FBI at John Wayne Airport in Orange County, California, on August 29, while waiting to board a flight back to Atlanta. His lawyer stated that Crittenton's sole purpose for the trip to Atlanta was to surrender himself to custody. Crittenton was extradited to Atlanta to stand trial for the murder. After his arrest, he denied any involvement. Crittenton was released on a $230,000 bond.

Crittenton and his cousin Douglas Gamble were officially indicted on April 2, 2013, on 12 counts in connection with Jones' death, including charges of murder, felony murder, aggravated assault with a deadly weapon, possession of a firearm during the commission of a felony, giving false statements, attempted murder, and participation in criminal street gang activity. Crittenton reportedly joined the Crips after signing with the Los Angeles Lakers, according to Fulton County assistant district attorney Gabe Banks, and allegedly also shot at Demontinez Stephens earlier in August 2011. The target in both shootings was reportedly Trontavious Stephens, Demontinez's brother and a member of the R.O.C. Crew, which is part of the Bloods.

While out on bond on the murder charges, Crittenton was arrested pursuant to a January 10, 2014, indictment of him and 13 other persons who were accused of selling multi-kilo quantities of cocaine and several hundred pounds of marijuana. Crittenton was charged with two counts of conspiracy to violate the Georgia Controlled Substance Act.

On April 29, 2015, shortly before his trial was set to begin, Crittenton pleaded guilty to voluntary manslaughter with a weapon and aggravated assault with a firearm. He was sentenced to 23 years in prison, later reduced to 10 years in a deal with the district attorney. He was released from prison on April 21, 2023.

== NBA career statistics ==
Legend
| GP | Games played | GS | Games started | MPG | Minutes per game |
| FG% | Field goal percentage | 3P% | 3-point field goal percentage | FT% | Free throw percentage |
| RPG | Rebounds per game | APG | Assists per game | SPG | Steals per game |
| BPG | Blocks per game | PPG | Points per game | **Bold** | Career high |

=== Regular season ===
| Year | Team | GP | GS | MPG | FG% | 3P% | FT% | RPG | APG | SPG | BPG | PPG |
|---|---|---|---|---|---|---|---|---|---|---|---|---|
| 2007–08 | L.A. Lakers | 22 | 0 | 7.8 | **.491** | **.333** | .679 | 1.0 | .8 | .3 | .0 | 3.3 |
| 2007–08 | Memphis | 28 | 0 | 18.1 | .400 | .265 | **.697** | **3.2** | 1.2 | .4 | .1 | **7.4** |
| 2008–09 | Memphis | 7 | 0 | 6.3 | .467 | .000 | .455 | .9 | .7 | .1 | .0 | 2.7 |
| 2008–09 | Washington | **56** | **10** | **20.2** | .459 | .143 | .593 | 2.9 | **2.6** | **.7** | **.1** | 5.3 |
| Career | | 113 | 10 | 16.4 | .442 | .231 | .638 | 2.4 | 1.8 | .5 | .1 | 5.3 |

== See also ==
- List of people banned or suspended by the NBA
- 2006 high school boys basketball All-Americans
- 2006-07 Georgia Tech Yellow Jackets men's basketball team
