= Brandan Wright =

American basketball player (born 1987)

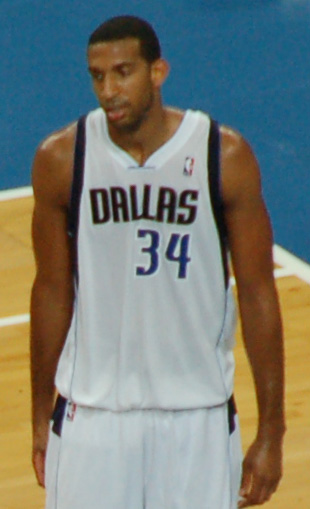
- Wright with the Dallas Mavericks in 2012

Free agent
- Position: Power forward / center

Personal information
- Born: October 5, 1987 (age 39) Nashville, Tennessee, U.S.
- Listed height: 6 ft 10 in (2.08 m)
- Listed weight: 235 lb (107 kg)

Career information
- High school: Brentwood Academy (Brentwood, Tennessee)
- College: North Carolina (2006–2007)
- NBA draft: 2007: 1st round, 8th overall pick
- Drafted by: Charlotte Bobcats
- Playing career: 2007–present

Career history
- 2007–2011: Golden State Warriors
- 2011: New Jersey Nets
- 2011–2014: Dallas Mavericks
- 2014–2015: Boston Celtics
- 2015: Phoenix Suns
- 2015–2018: Memphis Grizzlies
- 2018: Houston Rockets

Career highlights
- Second-team All-ACC (2007); ACC Rookie of the Year (2007); ACC All-Freshman Team (2007); ACC tournament MVP (2007); McDonald's All-American (2006); 2× First-team Parade All-American (2005, 2006); 3× Tennessee Mr. Basketball (2004–2006)
- Stats at NBA.com
- Stats at Basketball Reference

Brandan Keith Wright (born October 5, 1987) is a retired American professional basketball player who last played for the Houston Rockets of the National Basketball Association (NBA). Growing up in Tennessee, Wright fast became a standout at his high school Brentwood Academy, earning three "Mr. Basketball" titles, a feat no player at any level had ever done in Tennessee. After leading his high school team to four consecutive state championships, Wright was eventually recruited by the University of North Carolina at Chapel Hill's basketball team. In his lone season as a Tar Heel, Wright was named the Atlantic Coast Conference Rookie of the Year, and earned All-ACC Second Team honors. In the 2007 NBA draft, Wright was chosen eighth overall by the Charlotte Bobcats, and in a draft-night trade was dealt to the Golden State Warriors for guard Jason Richardson.

== Early years ==
Wright was born and raised in Nashville, Tennessee. In high school, Wright became a two-time first-team Parade All-American selection at Brentwood Academy. As a senior, Wright averaged 22.4 points, 9.4 rebounds, and 5.1 blocks per contest, and also recorded four triple-doubles (points, rebounds, assists). Wright earned Tennessee's Division II Mr. Basketball title in 2004, 2005, and 2006, becoming the first player ever to win the award three times at any level of Tennessee high school basketball. Wright led his Brentwood Academy team to four consecutive Tennessee state championships and was a four-time MVP of the Tennessee Division II private school state championship tournament. Wright led Brentwood Academy to four consecutive state titles, a first in Tennessee high school basketball history.

Considered a five-star recruit by Rivals.com, Wright was listed as the No. 1 power forward and the No. 3 player in the nation in 2006.

== College career ==
Wright appeared in thirty-seven games in his lone season at the University of North Carolina, starting all and averaging 14.7 points on 64.6% field goal shooting, 6.2 rebounds, 1.0 assists, and 1.76 blocks per game. His .646 field goal percentage led the Atlantic Coast Conference (ACC) and was the best ever by an ACC freshman. Wright led the North Carolina team in blocks (sixty-five, sixth in the ACC), and finished second on the team in scoring (14.7 ppg, thirteenth in the ACC) and rebounding (6.2 rpg, fourteenth in the ACC). He was also able to score 20-or-more points on eight occasions. Wright was able to score in double digits in his first eighteen games as a Tar Heel, making Rashad McCants and himself the only freshman Tar Heels to accomplish the feat in the last twenty years. Wright was named to the NCAA All-East Regional Team after averaging 12.8 points and 7.0 rebounds in four Tournament contests. Eventually, Wright was named MVP of the ACC Tournament, becoming just the fifth freshman in conference history to win the award. Wright was also named Atlantic Coast Conference Rookie of the Year (the third straight Tar Heel to earn the honor) and earned All-ACC Second Team honors.

=== College statistics ===
Year	Team	GP	GS	MPG	FG%	3P%	FT%	RPG	APG	SPG	BPG	PPG
2006–07	North Carolina	37	37	27.4	.646	.000	.567	6.2	1.0	1.0	1.8	14.7
Career		37	37	27.4	.646	.000	.567	6.2	1.0	1.0	1.8	14.7

== Professional career ==
=== Golden State Warriors (2007–2011) ===
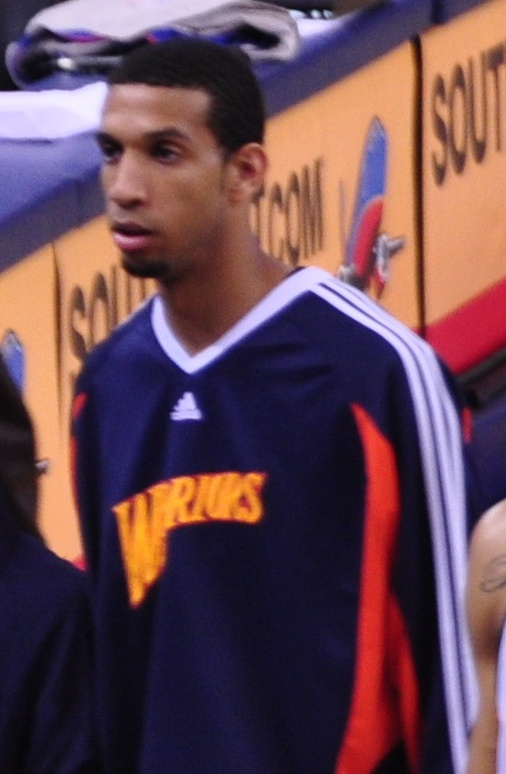
Wright before a game as a member of the Warriors in 2009

Wright became an early candidate for the 2007 NBA draft after his freshman year at the University of North Carolina. In the draft, Wright was selected by the Charlotte Bobcats with the eighth overall pick. Wright was then acquired by the Golden State Warriors in a draft-night trade in exchange for shooting guard Jason Richardson and the draft rights to Jermareo Davidson, whom Golden State chose with the 36th overall pick. Due to an injured hip flexor, Wright was unable to participate in summer league play during his rookie season. Of the thirty-eight games Wright played during his rookie season, he started in six. Wright entered the 2008–09 season with career averages of 4.0 points and 2.6 rebounds in 9.9 minutes over thirty-eight games in his rookie season. In January 2009, Wright partially dislocated his left shoulder late in the first half of a game against the Los Angeles Lakers.

On October 14, 2009, the Warriors extended Wright's contract until the end of the 2010–11 NBA season. Wright damaged his left shoulder capsule during practice on October 2, 2009. He underwent shoulder surgery and missed the 2009–10 season.

=== New Jersey Nets (2011) ===
On February 23, 2011, Wright was traded to the New Jersey Nets along with Dan Gadzuric in exchange for Troy Murphy and a second round pick.

=== Dallas Mavericks (2011–2014) ===
On December 9, 2011, he signed a deal with the Dallas Mavericks. Wright recorded a career-high seven blocked shots in a win at Houston on March 24, 2012. He became the eighth player in Mavericks history to record seven blocks in a game and the first since Erick Dampier in 2008. Wright matched the block total posted by the entire Rockets' team. Wright averaged 6.9 points, 3.6 rebounds and 1.3 blocks in 16.1 minutes per game in the 2011–12 NBA season. Wright scored in double figures 13 times and shot a team-high 61.8 percent from the field. Wright made his NBA Playoff debut in Game 1 at Oklahoma City on April 28. Wright scored his 1st career playoff point on a free throw attempt in Game 2 against the Thunder.

On July 25, 2013, Wright re-signed with the Mavericks.

=== Boston Celtics (2014–2015) ===
On December 18, 2014, Wright was traded, along with Jameer Nelson, Jae Crowder, a 2015 first-round pick, a 2016 second-round pick and a $12.9 million trade exception, to the Boston Celtics in exchange for Rajon Rondo and Dwight Powell.

=== Phoenix Suns (2015) ===
On January 9, 2015, Wright was traded to the Phoenix Suns in exchange for a protected 2015 first-round pick via the Minnesota Timberwolves. Wright would get 16 points, 8 rebounds, and tied a career-high 7 blocks while starting in a close 74–72 victory over the New Orleans Pelicans.

=== Memphis Grizzlies (2015–2018) ===
On July 9, 2015, Wright signed a three-year, $17.1 million contract the Memphis Grizzlies. After injuring his right knee on November 7, 2015, Wright missed the rest of the 2015–16 season bar a five-game stint in February.

Wright returned to the Grizzlies' line-up during the 2016 preseason, but after injuring his left ankle, he was sidelined for the start of the 2016–17 season. On November 16, 2016, he underwent a successful arthroscopic debridement of his left ankle after non-surgical interventions failed to eliminate his posterior tibialis tendinopathy. He was subsequently ruled out for two months. He made his season debut on January 30, 2017, against the Phoenix Suns.

Wright missed the majority of December 2017 with a groin injury. On February 10, 2018, he was waived by the Grizzlies.

=== Houston Rockets (2018) ===
On February 12, 2018, Wright signed with the Houston Rockets. On March 23, 2018, he was waived by the Rockets.

== NBA career statistics ==
Legend
GP	Games played	GS	Games started	MPG	Minutes per game
FG%	Field goal percentage	3P%	3-point field goal percentage	FT%	Free throw percentage
RPG	Rebounds per game	APG	Assists per game	SPG	Steals per game
BPG	Blocks per game	PPG	Points per game	**Bold**	Career high

=== Regular season ===
Year	Team	GP	GS	MPG	FG%	3P%	FT%	RPG	APG	SPG	BPG	PPG
2007–08	Golden State	38	6	9.9	.554	.000	.675	2.6	.2	.2	.6	4.0
2008–09	Golden State	39	**23**	17.6	.528	.000	.741	4.0	.5	**.6**	.9	8.3
2010–11	Golden State	21	1	9.3	.603	.000	.500	2.0	.2	.1	.5	4.0
2010–11	New Jersey	16	1	11.5	.407	.000	**.824**	3.0	.4	.5	.4	3.6
2011–12	Dallas	49	0	16.1	.618	.000	.634	3.6	.3	.4	1.3	6.9
2012–13	Dallas	**64**	16	18.0	.597	.000	.615	4.1	.6	.4	1.2	8.5
2013–14	Dallas	58	0	18.6	.677	.000	.726	4.2	.5	**.6**	.9	**9.1**
2014–15	Dallas	27	0	18.7	**.748**	.000	.750	4.1	.4	.6	**1.6**	8.8
2014–15	Boston	8	0	10.8	.571	.000	.500	2.1	**1.0**	.1	.6	3.3
2014–15	Phoenix	40	7	**21.5**	.580	.000	.667	**4.9**	.6	**.8**	1.2	7.0
2015–16	Memphis	12	2	17.7	.673	.000	.542	3.6	.5	.4	1.3	6.9
2016–17	Memphis	28	5	16.0	.615	.000	.657	2.8	.5	.4	.7	6.8
2017–18	Memphis	27	1	13.6	.576	.000	.636	3.4	.5	.5	.9	5.0
2017–18	Houston	1	0	15.0	.667	.000	.000	2.0	.0	.0	1.0	4.0
Career		428	62	16.2	.607	.000	.674	3.6	.5	.5	1.0	7.0

=== Playoffs ===
Year	Team	GP	GS	MPG	FG%	3P%	FT%	RPG	APG	SPG	BPG	PPG
2012	Dallas	4	0	6.8	.400	.000	**.500**	1.3	.0	**.3**	.3	1.3
2014	Dallas	**6**	0	**15.0**	**.833**	.000	**.500**	**2.0**	**1.3**	**.3**	**1.0**	**5.5**
2017	Memphis	2	0	6.0	.400	.000	.000	1.0	.0	.0	**1.0**	2.0
Career		12	0	10.8	.679	.000	.500	1.6	.7	.3	.8	3.5

== Player profile ==
Wright himself has said that growing up, his favorite player was Kevin Garnett and that he is also a fan of Chris Bosh's game and models some of his playing style from the two. He is considered to be a superior finisher from within twelve feet and especially at the rim. Wright's biggest weakness seemed to be his strength, as well as his sporadic defensive efforts.

== Personal life ==
Wright has two younger brothers, Brian and Trevor. The former played basketball at Lipscomb University in Nashville from 2007 to 2011. Wright has participated in various community outreach projects associated with the Golden State Warriors, including the opening of a new Reading and Learning Center at Megan Furth Academy in San Francisco. Wright has also taken part in the team's Thanksgiving Food Distribution event, made a visit to Children's Hospital in Oakland, and visited sessions of the Warriors Basketball Camp. Wright enjoys bowling, fishing, golfing, and playing video games. Wright's favorite actor is Will Smith and favorite movie Bad Boys II. Wright was a pitcher when he played baseball in his youth. He has said his favorite foods are fried chicken and steak. His favorite teams in other sports are the Atlanta Braves (MLB), Nashville Predators (NHL), and the Tennessee Titans (NFL). He wears a size fourteen shoe.

== See also ==
- 2006 high school boys basketball All-Americans
