= 2006–07 North Carolina Tar Heels men's basketball team =

American college basketball season

2006–07 North Carolina Tar Heels men's basketball

ACC Tournament champions ACC Regular Season Co-Champions

NCAA tournament, Elite Eight
- Conference: Atlantic Coast Conference

Ranking
- Coaches: No. 5
- AP: No. 4
- Record: 31–7 (11–5 ACC)
- Head coach: Roy Williams (4th season)
- Assistant coaches: Joe Holladay; Steve Robinson; C. B. McGrath
- Home arena: Dean Smith Center

2006–07 ACC men's basketball standings
| | Conf. | | | | Overall |
| Team | W | | L | PCT | W | | L | PCT |
|---|---|---|---|---|---|---|---|---|
| No. 4 North Carolina† | 11 | – | 5 | .688 | 31 | – | 7 | .816 |
| Virginia | 11 | – | 5 | .688 | 21 | – | 11 | .656 |
| Virginia Tech | 10 | – | 6 | .625 | 22 | – | 12 | .647 |
| Boston College | 10 | – | 6 | .625 | 21 | – | 12 | .636 |
| No. 18 Maryland | 10 | – | 6 | .625 | 25 | – | 9 | .735 |
| Georgia Tech | 8 | – | 8 | .500 | 20 | – | 12 | .625 |
| Duke | 8 | – | 8 | .500 | 22 | – | 11 | .667 |
| Clemson | 7 | – | 9 | .438 | 25 | – | 11 | .694 |
| Florida State | 7 | – | 9 | .438 | 22 | – | 13 | .629 |
| NC State | 5 | – | 11 | .313 | 20 | – | 16 | .556 |
| Wake Forest | 5 | – | 11 | .313 | 15 | – | 16 | .484 |
| Miami (FL) | 4 | – | 12 | .250 | 12 | – | 20 | .375 |
† 2007 ACC tournament winner Rankings from AP Poll

The 2006–07 North Carolina Tar Heels men's basketball team represented the University of North Carolina at Chapel Hill during the 2006–07 NCAA Division I men's basketball season. Their head coach was Roy Williams. The team played its home games in the Dean Smith Center in Chapel Hill, North Carolina as a member of the Atlantic Coast Conference.

== Recruiting ==
College recruiting information
| Name | Hometown | School | Height | Weight | Commit date |
|---|---|---|---|---|---|
| Wayne Ellington; SG | Wynnewood, Pennsylvania | The Episcopal Academy | 6 ft 4 in (1.93 m) | 200 lb (91 kg) | May 23, 2005 |
| Wayne Ellington; SG | Recruit ratings: Scout: Rivals: (N/A) | | | | |
| Will Graves; SF | Greensboro, North Carolina | Dudley HS | 6 ft 6 in (1.98 m) | 260 lb (120 kg) | Jan 17, 2005 |
| Will Graves; SF | Recruit ratings: Scout: Rivals: (N/A) | | | | |
| Ty Lawson; PG | Clinton, Maryland | Oak Hill Academy (VA) | 5 ft 11 in (1.80 m) | 195 lb (88 kg) | May 12, 2005 |
| Ty Lawson; PG | Recruit ratings: Scout: Rivals: (N/A) | | | | |
| Alex Stepheson; PF | Los Angeles, California | Harvard-Westlake HS | 6 ft 9 in (2.06 m) | 235 lb (107 kg) | Oct 11, 2005 |
| Alex Stepheson; PF | Recruit ratings: Scout: Rivals: (N/A) | | | | |
| Deon Thompson; C | Torrance, California | Torrance HS | 6 ft 9 in (2.06 m) | 245 lb (111 kg) | Oct 4, 2005 |
| Deon Thompson; C | Recruit ratings: Scout: Rivals: (N/A) | | | | |
| Brandan Wright; PF | Nashville, Tennessee | Brentwood Academy | 6 ft 9 in (2.06 m) | 205 lb (93 kg) | Oct 16, 2005 |
| Brandan Wright; PF | Recruit ratings: Scout: Rivals: (N/A) | | | | |
Overall recruit ranking: Scout: 1 Rivals: 1 ESPN: N/A
Note: In many cases, Scout, Rivals, 247Sports, On3, and ESPN may conflict in their listings of height and weight.; In these cases, the average was taken. ESPN grades are on a 100-point scale.; Sources: "North Carolina Basketball Commitments". Rivals.; "2006 North Carolina Basketball Commits". Scout.; "ESPN". ESPN.; "Scout.com Team Recruiting Rankings". Scout.; "2006 Team Ranking". Rivals.

== Roster ==
2006–07 North Carolina Tar Heels men's basketball team
Players
Coaches

| Pos. | # | Name | Height | Weight | Year | Previous school | Hometown |
|---|---|---|---|---|---|---|---|
| G | 15 | Dewey Burke | 6 ft 0 in (1.83 m) | 185 lb (84 kg) | Sr | Conestoga | Philadelphia |
| G | 25 | Marc Campbell | 5 ft 11 in (1.8 m) | 165 lb (75 kg) | So | Ravenscroft | Raleigh, North Carolina |
| F | 40 | Mike Copeland | 6 ft 7 in (2.01 m) | 225 lb (102 kg) | So | R. J. Reynolds | Winston-Salem, North Carolina |
| G | 2 | Wayne Ellington | 6 ft 4 in (1.93 m) | 195 lb (88 kg) | Fr | Episcopal Academy | Wynnewood, Pennsylvania |
| G | 4 | Bobby Frasor | 6 ft 3 in (1.91 m) | 208 lb (94 kg) | So | Brother Rice | Blue Island, Illinois |
| G/F | 1 | Marcus Ginyard | 6 ft 5 in (1.96 m) | 218 lb (99 kg) | So | Bishop O'Connell | Alexandria, Virginia |
| F | 13 | Will Graves | 6 ft 6 in (1.98 m) | 260 lb (118 kg) | Fr | Dudley | Greensboro, North Carolina |
| G/F | 14 | Danny Green | 6 ft 5 in (1.96 m) | 210 lb (95 kg) | So | St. Mary's | North Babylon, New York |
| C | 50 | Tyler Hansbrough | 6 ft 9 in (2.06 m) | 245 lb (111 kg) | So | Poplar Bluff | Poplar Bluff, Missouri |
| G | 5 | Ty Lawson | 5 ft 11 in (1.8 m) | 193 lb (88 kg) | Fr | Oak Hill Academy | Clinton, Maryland |
| G | 22 | Wes Miller | 5 ft 11 in (1.8 m) | 190 lb (86 kg) | Sr | New Hampton School | Charlotte, North Carolina |
| F | 32 | Alex Stepheson | 6 ft 9 in (2.06 m) | 225 lb (102 kg) | Fr | Harvard-Westlake | Los Angeles, California |
| F | 3 | Reyshawn Terry | 6 ft 8 in (2.03 m) | 232 lb (105 kg) | Sr | R. J. Reynolds | Winston-Salem, North Carolina |
| G | 11 | Quentin Thomas | 6 ft 3 in (1.91 m) | 185 lb (84 kg) | Jr | Oakland Technical Senior | Oakland, California |
| F | 21 | Deon Thompson | 6 ft 8 in (2.03 m) | 240 lb (109 kg) | Fr | Torrance | Torrance, California |
| F | 24 | Surry Wood | 6 ft 5 in (1.96 m) | 205 lb (93 kg) | Jr | Cary Academy | Raleigh, North Carolina |
| F | 34 | Brandan Wright | 6 ft 9 in (2.06 m) | 205 lb (93 kg) | Fr | Brentwood Academy | Nashville, Tennessee |

Head coach

Roy Williams

Assistant coach(es)

Joe Holladay
Steve Robinson
C. B. McGrath

Legend

- (C) Team captain
- (S) Suspended
- (I) Ineligible
- (W) Walk-on
- Injured
- Current redshirt

Roster
Last update: October 29, 2012

== Schedule and results ==
| Date time, TV | Rank^{#} | Opponent^{#} | Result | Record | Site (attendance) city, state |
Exhibition
| November 1*; 7:30 pm | No. 2 | St Augustine's College | W 110–79 | | Dean Smith Center (12,230); Chapel Hill, North Carolina |
| November 11*; 5:00 pm | No. 2 | Pfeiffer | W 140–101 | | Dean Smith Center (21,750); Chapel Hill, North Carolina |
Regular Season
| November 14*; 7:00 pm, ESPNU | No. 2 | vs. Sacred Heart; NIT Season Tip-Off Regional semifinals | W 103–81 | 1–0 | Charlotte Bobcats Arena (7,060); Charlotte, North Carolina |
| November 15*; 7:00 pm, ESPN | No. 2 | vs. Winthrop; NIT Season Tip-Off Regional Final | W 73–66 | 2–0 | Charlotte Bobcats Arena (7,362); Charlotte, North Carolina |
| November 19*; 1:00 pm, FSN | No. 2 | Gardner-Webb | W 103–50 | 3–0 | Dean Smith Center (19,045); Chapel Hill, North Carolina |
| November 22*; 9:15 pm, ESPN2 | No. 2 | vs. Gonzaga; NIT Season Tip-Off Semifinals | L 74–82 | 3–1 | Madison Square Garden (9,123); New York City |
| November 24*; 4:30 pm, ESPN | No. 2 | vs. No. 22 Tennessee; NIT Season Tip-Off Consolation Game | W 101–87 | 4–1 | Madison Square Garden (9,498); New York |
| November 29*; 9:00 pm, ESPN | No. 7 | No. 3 Ohio State; ACC–Big Ten Challenge | W 98–89 | 5–1 | Dean Smith Center (21,750); Chapel Hill, North Carolina |
| December 2*; 12:00 pm, CBS | No. 7 | Kentucky | W 75–63 | 6–1 | Dean Smith Center (21,147); Chapel Hill, North Carolina |
| December 9*; 7:00 pm | No. 3 | High Point | W 94–69 | 7–1 | Dean Smith Center (19,955); Chapel Hill, North Carolina |
| December 16*; 2:00 pm, FSN | No. 3 | UNC Asheville | W 93–62 | 8–1 | Dean Smith Center (18,923); Chapel Hill, North Carolina |
| December 19*; 7:00 pm, ESPNU | No. 2 | Florida Atlantic | W 105–52 | 9–1 | Dean Smith Center (18,162); Chapel Hill, North Carolina |
| December 22*; 7:00 pm, ESPNU | No. 2 | at Saint Louis | W 69–48 | 10–1 | Scottrade Center (22,539); St. Louis, Missouri |
| December 28*; 7:00 pm, ESPN2 | No. 2 | Rutgers | W 87–48 | 11–1 | Dean Smith Center (20,997); Chapel Hill, North Carolina |
| December 31*; 3:00 pm, FSN | No. 2 | Dayton | W 81–51 | 12–1 | Dean Smith Center (19,967); Chapel Hill, North Carolina |
| January 3*; 8:00 pm, ESPN | No. 2 | Penn | W 102–64 | 13–1 | Dean Smith Center (19,378); Chapel Hill, North Carolina |
| January 7; 7:00 pm, FSN | No. 2 | Florida State | W 84–58 | 14–1 (1–0) | Dean Smith Center (21,010); Chapel Hill, North Carolina |
| January 10; 9:00 pm, Raycom | No. 1 | Virginia | W 79–69 | 15–1 (2–0) | Dean Smith Center (21,569); Chapel Hill, North Carolina |
| January 13; 3:30 pm, ABC | No. 1 | at Virginia Tech | L 88–94 | 15–2 (2–1) | Cassell Coliseum (9,847); Blacksburg, Virginia |
| January 17; 7:00 pm, ESPN | No. 4 | at No. 19 Clemson | W 77–55 | 16–2 (3–1) | Littlejohn Coliseum (10,000); Clemson, South Carolina |
| January 20; 9:00 pm, ESPN | No. 4 | Georgia Tech; ESPN College GameDay | W 77–61 | 17–2 (4–1) | Dean Smith Center (21,750); Chapel Hill, North Carolina |
| January 24; 7:00 pm, ESPN | No. 4 | at Wake Forest | W 88–60 | 18–2 (5–1) | Lawrence Joel Veterans Memorial Coliseum (14,351); Winston-Salem, North Carolina |
| January 27*; 1:00 pm, CBS | No. 4 | at No. 17 Arizona | W 92–64 | 19–2 (5–1) | McKale Center (14,596); Tucson, Arizona |
| January 31; 7:00 pm, ESPN | No. 3 | Miami (FL) | W 105–64 | 20–2 (6–1) | Dean Smith Center (21,132); Chapel Hill, North Carolina |
| February 3; 3:30 pm, ABC | No. 3 | at NC State | L 79–83 | 21–3 (6–2) | RBC Center (19,700); Raleigh, North Carolina |
| February 7; 9:00 pm, Raycom/ESPN | No. 5 | at No. 16 Duke | W 79–73 | 22–3 (7–2) | Cameron Indoor Stadium (9,314); Durham, North Carolina |
| February 10; 1:30 pm, Raycom | No. 5 | Wake Forest | W 104–67 | 23–3 (8–2) | Dean Smith Center (21,750); Chapel Hill, North Carolina |
| February 13; 8:00 pm, Raycom | No. 4 | Virginia Tech | L 80–81 ^{OT} | 23–4 (8–3) | Dean Smith Center (21,750); Chapel Hill, North Carolina |
| February 17; 9:00 pm, ESPN | No. 4 | at No. 21 Boston College; ESPN College GameDay | W 77–72 | 23–4 (9–3) | Conte Forum (8,606); Chestnut Hill, Massachusetts |
| February 21; 9:00 pm, Raycom | No. 5 | NC State | W 83–64 | 24–4 (10–3) | Dean Smith Center (21,750); Chapel Hill, North Carolina |
| February 25; 5:30 pm, FSN | No. 5 | at Maryland | L 87–89 | 24–5 (10–4) | Comcast Center (17,950); College Park, Maryland |
| March 1; 9:00 pm, Raycom/ESPN2 | No. 8 | at Georgia Tech | L 77–84 | 24–6 (10–5) | Alexander Memorial Coliseum (9,191); Atlanta |
| March 4; 4:00 pm, CBS | No. 8 | No. 14 Duke | W 86–72 | 25–6 (11–5) | Dean Smith Center (21,750); Chapel Hill, North Carolina |
ACC tournament
| March 9; 12:00 pm | (1) No. 8 | vs. (9) Florida State; Quarterfinals | W 73–58 | 26–6 | St. Pete Times Forum (22,269); Tampa, Florida |
| March 10; 1:30 pm, Raycom/ESPN | (1) No. 8 | vs. (4) Boston College; Semifinals | W 71–56 | 27–6 | St. Pete Times Forum (22,269); Tampa, Florida |
| March 11; 1:00 pm, Raycom/ESPN | (1) No. 8 | vs. (10) NC State; Championship | W 89–80 | 28–6 | St. Pete Times Forum (22,269); Tampa, Florida |
NCAA tournament
| March 15*; 9:50 pm, CBS | (1 E) No. 4 | vs. (16 E) Eastern Kentucky; First round | W 86–65 | 29–6 | Lawrence Joel Veterans Memorial Coliseum (14,148); Winston-Salem, North Carolina |
| March 17*; 8:20 pm, CBS | (1 E) No. 4 | vs. (9 E) Michigan State; Second Round | W 81–67 | 30–6 | Lawrence Joel Veterans Memorial Coliseum (14,148); Winston-Salem, North Carolina |
| March 23*; 9:57 pm, CBS | (1 E) No. 4 | vs. (5 E) No. 23 USC; Sweet Sixteen | W 74–64 | 31–6 | Continental Airlines Arena (19,557); East Rutherford, New Jersey |
| March 25*; 5:05 pm, CBS | (1 E) No. 4 | vs. (2 E) No. 8 Georgetown; Elite Eight | L 84–96 ^{OT} | 31–7 | Continental Airlines Arena (19,557); East Rutherford, New Jersey |
*Non-Conference Game. ^{#}Rankings from AP Poll. All times are in Eastern Time.

== Team players drafted into the NBA ==
| Year | Round | Pick | Player | NBA club |
| 2007 | 1 | 8 | Brandan Wright | Golden State Warriors |
| 2007 | 2 | 44 | Reyshawn Terry | Orlando Magic |
| 2009 | 1 | 13 | Tyler Hansbrough | Indiana Pacers |
| 2009 | 1 | 18 | Ty Lawson | Denver Nuggets |
| 2009 | 1 | 28 | Wayne Ellington | Minnesota Timberwolves |
| 2009 | 2 | 46 | Danny Green | Cleveland Cavaliers |
