= Ekene Ibekwe =

American-Nigerian basketball player

No. 22 – Urunday Universitario
- Position: Power forward / center
- League: Liga Uruguaya de Básquetbol

Personal information
- Born: July 19, 1985 (age 41) Los Angeles, California, U.S.
- Listed height: 6 ft 9 in (2.06 m)
- Listed weight: 220 lb (100 kg)

Career information
- High school: Carson (Carson, California)
- College: Maryland (2003–2007)
- NBA draft: 2007: undrafted
- Playing career: 2007–present

Career history
- 2007–2008: Hapoel Gilboa/Afula
- 2008: Besançon
- 2008–2009: Selçuk Üniversitesi
- 2009: Gigantes de Carolina
- 2009–2010: Petrochimi Bandar Imam
- 2010: Bandırma Kırmızı
- 2010: Artland Dragons
- 2010–2011: Ironi Ashkelon
- 2011–2012: Bayreuth
- 2012–2013: Gipuzkoa
- 2014–2015: New Zealand Breakers
- 2015: Atenienses de Manatí
- 2015: Gießen 46ers
- 2016: Krasny Oktyabr
- 2016: Hekmeh
- 2016: Nymburk
- 2016: Skyliners Frankfurt
- 2017: Uşak Sportif
- 2017: Élan Chalon
- 2017: Oettinger Rockets
- 2018: Châlons-Reims
- 2018–2019: Levallois Metropolitans
- 2019: Sporting Al Riyadi Beirut
- 2019–2020: Élan Béarnais
- 2020–2021: Châlons-Reims
- 2021–2022: Chorale Roanne Basket
- 2022–present: Urunday Universitario

Career highlights
- French League champion (2017); NBL champion (2015); All-NBL Second Team (2015); LNB Pro B champion (2008); TBL All-Star (2009); ACC All-Defensive Team (2007); Second-team Parade All-American (2003)

Ekenechukwu Brian Ibekwe (born July 19, 1985) is a Nigerian American professional basketball player for Urunday Universitario of the Liga Uruguaya de Básquetbol. He played college basketball for the University of Maryland at College Park and represents the Nigerian national basketball team in international competitions.

== High school career ==
Ibekwe attended Carson High School in Carson, California. As a senior in 2002–03, he was a second-team Parade All-American after averaging 19.9 points, 10.2 rebounds and 4.4 blocks per game in leading his squad to a 23–4 record and a semi-final finish in the Los Angeles city championship. He also earned all-state honors and a first-team "All-Dream Team" nod by the Long Beach Press-Telegram as a senior, while he was named to the All-L.A. city first team, the All-South Bay first team, and his team's MVP as a junior and senior.

== College career ==
In his freshman season at Maryland, Ibekwe was the only freshman to play in all 32 games, drawing seven starts during his rookie season. He led the Terps in blocked shots with 44, an average of 1.4 per game, becoming the first freshman to lead the Terps in blocked shots since Joe Smith (1993–94). In those 32 games, he averaged 4.9 points and 3.9 rebounds per game.

In his sophomore season, he played in 30 of 32 games on the season, starting 18 while finishing fifth on the team in scoring with 8.4 points per game and second in rebounding with 6.3 boards. He also led the team in blocks with 55, finishing fourth among ACC leaders with 1.83 blocks per game. On November 30, 2004, he recorded his first career double-double with a career-high 21 points on 10-of-13 shooting at Wisconsin.

In his junior season, he appeared in 32 games and made 30 starts while averaging 11.1 points and 6.6 rebounds per game; he also finished the year seventh in the ACC with 1.34 blocks per game.

In his senior season, he earned ACC All-Defensive Team and All-ACC Honorable Mention honors. In 32 games, he averaged 10.4 points, 7.8 rebounds and 2.7 blocks per game. For his career, he accrued 1,107 points, 781 rebounds and 230 blocks, becoming the fourth player in school history (and the first since Lonny Baxter) to record 1,000 points, 500 rebounds and 200 blocks.

== Professional career ==
=== 2007–08 season ===
Ibekwe went undrafted in the 2007 NBA draft. In August 2007, he signed with Hapoel Galil Elyon of Israel for the 2007–08 season. In October 2007, he was released by Galil Elyon and later signed with Hapoel Gilboa/Afula. In February 2008, he parted ways with Gilboa/Afula. The next month, he joined Besançon BCD of France for the rest of the season.

=== 2008–09 season ===
In July 2008, Ibekwe joined the Phoenix Suns for the 2008 NBA Summer League. He later signed with Selçuk Üniversitesi of Turkey for the 2008–09 season.

In May 2009, he joined Gigantes de Carolina for the rest of the 2009 BSN season.

=== 2009–10 season ===
In July 2009, Ibekwe joined the Toronto Raptors for the 2009 NBA Summer League. He later signed with Antalya Kepez Belediyesi of Turkey but was waived before the start of the season. In December 2009, he signed with Iman Harbour of the Iranian Basketball Super League. In January 2010, he left Iman and signed with Genç Banvitliler of Turkey for the rest of the season.

=== 2010–11 season ===
In July 2010, Ibekwe joined the Portland Trail Blazers for the 2010 NBA Summer League. In August 2010, he signed with the Artland Dragons of Germany for the 2010–11 season. On December 16, 2010, he parted ways with Artland. Three days later, he signed with Ironi Ashkelon of Israel for the rest of the season.

In February 2011, he parted ways with Ironi and signed with Bayreuth of Germany for the rest of the season.

=== 2011–12 season ===
On July 8, 2011, Ibekwe re-signed with Bayreuth for the 2011–12 season.

=== 2012–13 season ===
In July 2012, Ibekwe re-joined the Portland Trail Blazers for the 2012 NBA Summer League. On August 16, 2012, he signed with Lagun Aro GBC of Spain for the 2012–13 season.

=== 2014–15 season ===
On August 18, 2014, Ibekwe signed with the New Zealand Breakers for the 2014–15 NBL season. In what was a great season for Ibekwe, he earned All-NBL second team honors and helped lead the Breakers to the NBL Grand Final. After winning Game 1 against the Cairns Taipans in Cairns, Game 2 shifted to Auckland, where in the dying seconds of the game, it was tied up 81–81. Coming out of the timeout, Ibekwe hit a game-winning fade-away shot to lift the Breakers over the Taipans 83–81 and thus clinched the team's fourth title in five seasons.

On March 18, 2015, he signed with Atenienses de Manatí of the Baloncesto Superior Nacional to replace center Jerome James. His stint with Manatí lasted just 11 games as he parted ways with the club in mid-April. In those 11 games, he averaged 9.1 points, 6.4 rebounds and 1.2 blocks per game.

=== 2015–16 season ===
On August 10, 2015, Ibekwe signed with Melbourne United for the 2015–16 NBL season. On September 26, he signed with the Gießen 46ers of Germany's Basketball Bundesliga. On November 22, he parted ways with Gießen.

On January 2, 2016, he signed with the Russian club Krasny Oktyabr of the VTB United League.

On May 2, 2016, Ibekwe signed with Hekmeh BC to replace the injured Todd O'Brien in the Final Four of the Lebanese Basketball League.

=== 2016–17 season ===
On July 20, 2016, Ibekwe signed with ČEZ Nymburk of the Czech Republic for the 2016–17 season. On October 20, 2016, he left Nymburk and signed a two-month contract with German club Skyliners Frankfurt. Following the expiration of the contract, he left Frankfurt. On December 30, 2016, he signed with Turkish club Uşak Sportif.

On May 1, 2017, Ibekwe signed with the French LNB Pro A club Élan Chalon for the rest of the 2016–17 Pro A season.

=== 2017–18 season ===
On September 4, 2017, Ibekwe signed a three-month contract with German club Oettinger Rockets. On December 30, 2017, he signed with French club Champagne Châlons-Reims Basket for the rest of the 2017–18 Pro A season.

=== 2019–20 season ===
On November 29, 2019, he has signed with Élan Béarnais of the LNB Pro A. Ibekwe averaged 8.7 points and 6.6 rebounds per game.

=== 2020–21 season ===
On August 7, 2020, Ibekwe signed with Champagne Châlons-Reims Basket.

On February 11, 2021, he has signed with Chorale Roanne Basket of the LNB Pro A.

== International career ==
Ibekwe has been a member of the senior men's Nigerian national basketball team. He played at the 2006 FIBA World Championship, where he was one of the team's leaders in points (4th) and rebounds (1st). He also played at the 2012 and 2016 Summer Olympics.

== Personal ==
Ibekwe is the son of Nigerian parents, Agatha and Augustine Ibekwe. His brother, Onye, played college basketball for Long Beach State. He also has two sisters, Chinyere and Ify. Ify Ibekwe is also a professional basketball player; she represents the Nigerian women's national basketball team in international competitions.
