= Jason Richardson =

American basketball player (born 1981)

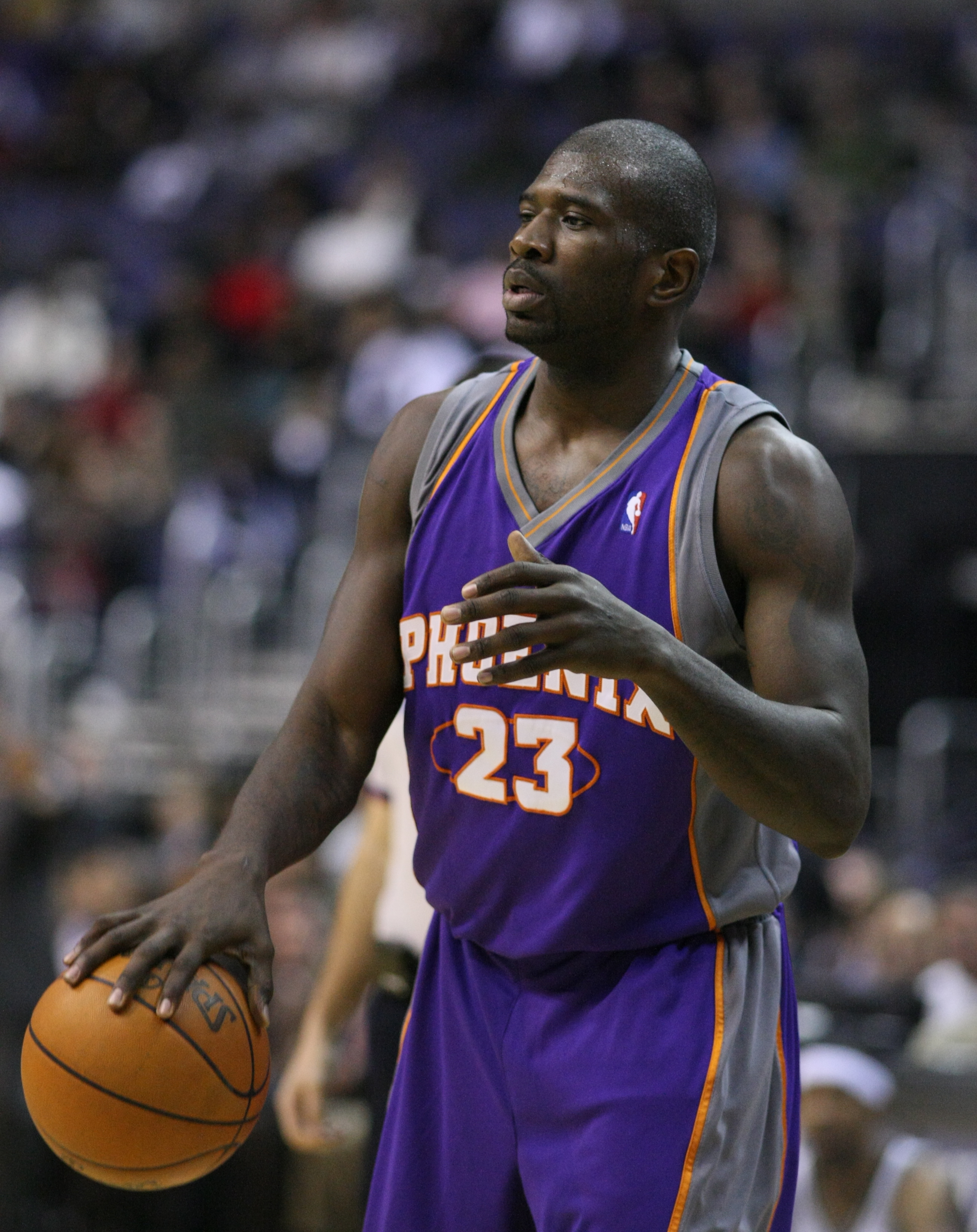
- Richardson with the Phoenix Suns in 2009

Personal information
- Born: January 20, 1981 (age 45) Saginaw, Michigan, U.S.
- Listed height: 6 ft 6 in (1.98 m)
- Listed weight: 225 lb (102 kg)

Career information
- High school: Arthur Hill (Saginaw, Michigan)
- College: Michigan State (1999–2001)
- NBA draft: 2001: 1st round, 5th overall pick
- Drafted by: Golden State Warriors
- Playing career: 2001–2015
- Position: Shooting guard
- Number: 23

Career history
- 2001–2007: Golden State Warriors
- 2007–2008: Charlotte Bobcats
- 2008–2010: Phoenix Suns
- 2010–2012: Orlando Magic
- 2012–2015: Philadelphia 76ers

Career highlights
- 2× NBA Slam Dunk Contest champion (2002, 2003); NBA All-Rookie First Team (2002); NCAA champion (2000); Consensus second-team All-American (2001); First-team All-Big Ten (2001); Second-team Parade All-American (1999); McDonald's All-American (1999); Mr. Basketball of Michigan (1999)

Career statistics
- Points: 14,644 (17.1 ppg)
- Rebounds: 4,245 (5.0 rpg)
- Assists: 2,284 (2.7 apg)
- Stats at NBA.com
- Stats at Basketball Reference

Jason Anthoney Richardson Sr. (born January 20, 1981) is an American former professional basketball player who played 14 seasons in the National Basketball Association (NBA). Richardson was taken by the Golden State Warriors as the fifth overall pick in the 2001 NBA draft after playing college basketball for the Michigan State Spartans. Richardson has also played for the Charlotte Bobcats, Phoenix Suns, Orlando Magic, and the Philadelphia 76ers. Richardson will join the Altitude Sports and Entertainment television coverage team of the Denver Nuggets for the upcoming 2026-27 season as a studio analyst.

Richardson is often remembered for his proficiency in dunking and shooting. Early in his career, he won the NBA Dunk Contest in both 2002 and 2003, becoming the second player, after Michael Jordan, to win the competition in consecutive years. Later, he became a more proficient shooter, leading the league in three-pointers made from the 2007–08 to 2011–12 seasons, with 820. Since 2021, Richardson has been an active player for Tri-State of the BIG3.

== Early life and college ==
Born in Saginaw, Michigan, Richardson graduated from Arthur Hill High School in 1999. Having led the Arthur Hill basketball team to the Class A championship game, Richardson was Mr. Basketball of Michigan and a McDonald's High School All-American in his senior year. Richardson chose to play college basketball for Michigan State head coach Tom Izzo.

In his freshman season at Michigan State, Richardson averaged 5.1 points per game in 37 games (including three starts) and made 50.3% of attempted field goals. Led by Mateen Cleaves and Morris Peterson, the Spartans won the NCAA Championship with Richardson as a key reserve. In a bigger role in his sophomore season at Michigan State, he led the Spartans in scoring averaging 14.7 points per game. Richardson played along future NBA players Zach Randolph and Charlie Bell as the Spartans advanced to the Final Four before losing to Arizona. He was named Big Ten First Team that year.

Richardson graduated from the University of Florida with his Bachelor of Arts in Sports Management in 2025, the school him and Spartans beat for the 2000 NCAA Men's Basketball National Championship.

== Professional career ==
=== Golden State Warriors (2001–2007) ===
The Warriors drafted Jason Richardson out of Michigan State with the 5th overall pick.

Richardson competed in the Rookie Challenge as a rookie in 2002 and a sophomore in 2003. His teams won both years, and he was awarded the Rookie Challenge MVP as a rookie. As a sophomore, he had a memorable moment when, in the closing seconds of the game, he bounced the ball off Carlos Boozer's forehead and then made a three-pointer before the clock ran out.

During his time with Golden State, Richardson gained popularity for his outstanding scoring, ability to dunk, dedication to the team and fans, and ethical maturity. As the long time captain of the Warriors, Richardson organized a letter of apology to Warrior fans in 2005 after the team failed to make the playoffs for the 12th straight season. The letter ran in several Bay Area newspapers. The following year, Richardson helped lead the Warriors to their first playoff trip in 13 years. The Warriors upset the top-seeded Dallas Mavericks in the first round, but lost in the second round to the Utah Jazz.

Even after leaving Golden State, Richardson remained one of the most popular players among Warrior fans because of his electric style of play and ability to shoot three-pointers, as well as the longevity and tenor of his tenure with the team. Richardson set the Warrior franchise record for three-pointers made in a game without missing (8) in a home win against the Phoenix Suns. Richardson is especially known for his high-flying abilities and is widely regarded as one of the best dunkers in 2000s. He won the NBA Slam Dunk Contests in 2002 and 2003, and also competed in the 2004 contest, but lost to Fred Jones in the finals and stopped participating.

=== Charlotte Bobcats (2007–2008) ===
On June 28, 2007, Richardson was traded to the Charlotte Bobcats along with the draft rights to 36th pick Jermareo Davidson for the draft rights to eighth pick Brandan Wright.

Richardson began to gain attention with the Bobcats when he led the team to a road win against the Boston Celtics after scoring 34 points. This was only the Celtics' fourth loss of the season and second loss at home. It was also the Bobcats' second road win of the season, ending an 11-game road losing streak. Richardson also led the Bobcats to a franchise-record five consecutive game winning streak, including a home win against his former team, the Golden State Warriors. Richardson posted 42 points against the Warriors. The 2007–08 season was a season of rebuilding for Richardson and the Bobcats. He was able to get his points per game average back up to 21.8, lead the Bobcats in scoring, and lead the league in three-point field goals made.

=== Phoenix Suns (2008–2010) ===
On December 10, 2008, Richardson was traded along with Jared Dudley, and a 2010 second-round pick to the Phoenix Suns for Boris Diaw, Raja Bell and Sean Singletary. The Suns dealt for Richardson, as they were looking for another backcourt scorer to take pressure off of Steve Nash.

In his first game as a Sun, Richardson scored a game-high 21 points, including an alley-oop from Leandro Barbosa that brought the crowd to their feet. His first year in Phoenix resulted in the team missing the playoffs for the first time since 2003.

However, in his second year with the team, he helped bring them back to the playoffs with his play on both the offensive and defensive sides of the ball. In the first round of the 2010 NBA Playoffs, Richardson led the Suns to a first-round victory over the Portland Trail Blazers, including a career playoff-high 42 points in a Game 3 blowout. In the next round, Richardson helped the Suns to a series sweep against the San Antonio Spurs, before falling to the Los Angeles Lakers in game 6 of the Western Conference Finals.

=== Orlando Magic (2010–2012) ===
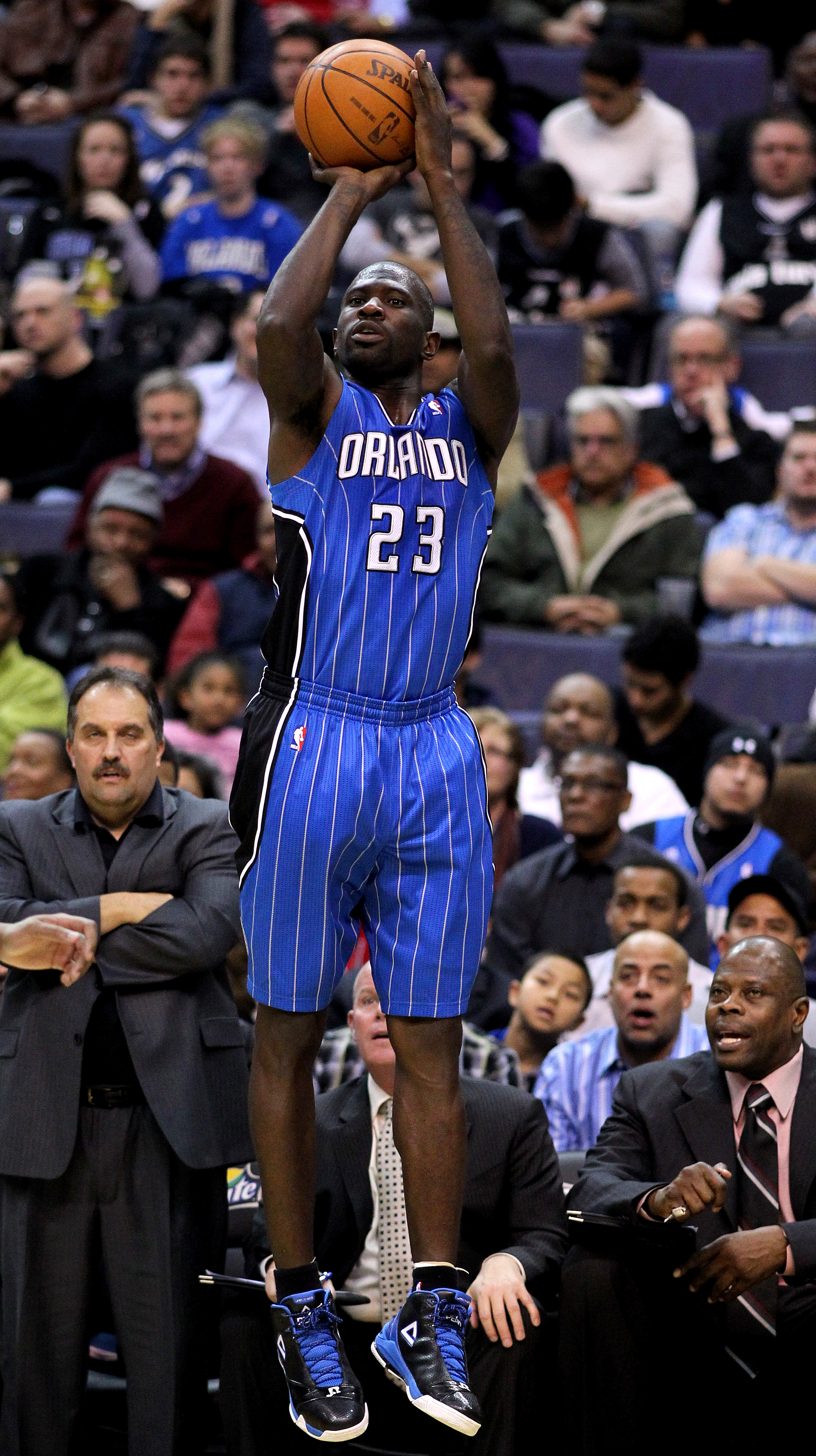
Richardson with the Orlando Magic in 2010

On December 18, 2010, Richardson was traded to the Orlando Magic along with Hedo Türkoğlu and Earl Clark for Vince Carter, Marcin Gortat, Mickaël Piétrus, a 2011 first-round draft pick and $3 million cash. In December 2011, Richardson agreed to a four-year, $25 million contract to remain in Orlando. The Magic made the playoffs in Richardson's first year with the team, losing in the first round to the Atlanta Hawks.

=== Philadelphia 76ers (2012–2015) ===
On August 10, 2012, Richardson was traded to the Philadelphia 76ers in a four-team deal which sent Dwight Howard to the Los Angeles Lakers. He managed just 33 games in 2012–13 before being ruled out for the rest of the season in January 2013 after undergoing surgery on his left knee, and subsequently sat out the entire 2013–14 season with the injury as well.

On February 18, 2015, Richardson was a full participant in practice for the first time in over two years after having not taken to the court in 762 days. Two days later, he returned to action for the 76ers as he started against the Indiana Pacers. In 18 minutes of play, he recorded 7 points, 7 rebounds, 2 assists, 2 steals and 1 block in the 95–106 loss. On March 4, 2015, he scored a season-high 29 points in a 123–118 overtime loss in Oklahoma City to the Thunder.

Richardson's final NBA game ever was played on April 11, 2015, in a 107–114 loss to the Chicago Bulls. In that game, Richardson recorded 19 points, 4 rebounds, 2 assists and 1 steal.

=== Retirement ===
On August 18, 2015, Richardson signed with the Atlanta Hawks. However, less than a month later, Richardson began experiencing pain in his right knee, and an MRI revealed bone spurs. On September 23, he announced his retirement from the NBA, citing he feared that his ability to walk would be impaired for the rest of his life if he continued to play.

== Post-playing career ==
On August 20, 2026, Altitude Sports hired Richardson as a studio analyst for Denver Nuggets games for the 2026–27 NBA season.

== Personal life ==
Richardson is the father of Orlando Magic guard Jase Richardson. His younger son, Jaxon, is a consensus five-star recruit for the 2026 class, and is committed to play basketball for The University of Alabama.

== Awards and accomplishments ==
Richardson is in the Class of 2025 for the Michigan Sports Hall of Fame and enshrined on December 19, 2025 in Detroit.

=== NBA ===
- NBA Slam Dunk Champion: 2002, 2003
- Rookie Challenge MVP: 2002
- NBA All-Rookie First Team: 2002
- NBA three-point scoring leader: (2008)

=== College ===
- NCAA champion: 2000
- Consensus second team All-American: 2001
- All-Big Ten First Team: 2001

=== High school ===
- McDonald's All-American: 1999
- Mr. Basketball of Michigan: 1999
- Parade All-American Second Team: 1999

== NBA career statistics ==
Legend
GP	Games played	GS	Games started	MPG	Minutes per game
FG%	Field goal percentage	3P%	3-point field goal percentage	FT%	Free throw percentage
RPG	Rebounds per game	APG	Assists per game	SPG	Steals per game
BPG	Blocks per game	PPG	Points per game	**Bold**	Career high
*	Led the league

=== Regular season ===
Year	Team	GP	GS	MPG	FG%	3P%	FT%	RPG	APG	SPG	BPG	PPG
2001–02	Golden State	80	75	32.9	.426	.333	.671	4.3	3.0	1.3	.4	14.4
2002–03	Golden State	**82**	**82***	32.9	.410	.368	.764	4.6	3.0	1.1	.3	15.6
2003–04	Golden State	78	78	37.6	.438	.282	.684	**6.7**	2.9	1.1	.5	18.7
2004–05	Golden State	72	72	37.8	.446	.338	.693	5.9	**3.9**	**1.5**	.4	21.7
2005–06	Golden State	75	75	**38.4**	.446	.384	.673	5.8	3.1	1.3	.5	**23.2**
2006–07	Golden State	51	49	32.8	.417	.365	.657	5.1	3.4	1.1	.6	16.0
2007–08	Charlotte	**82***	**82***	**38.4**	.441	.406	.752	5.4	3.1	1.4	**.7**	21.8
2008–09	Charlotte	14	14	35.1	.441	**.458**	.745	4.1	2.6	1.0	.2	18.7
2008–09	Phoenix	58	57	33.1	**.488**	.383	**.778**	4.5	1.9	1.1	.4	16.4
2009–10	Phoenix	79	76	31.5	.474	.393	.739	5.1	1.8	.8	.4	15.7
2010–11	Phoenix	25	25	31.8	.470	.419	.764	4.4	1.4	1.1	.1	19.3
2010–11	Orlando	55	55	34.9	.433	.384	.701	4.0	2.0	1.2	.2	13.9
2011–12	Orlando	54	54	29.5	.408	.368	.594	3.6	2.0	1.0	.4	11.6
2012–13	Philadelphia	33	33	28.4	.402	.341	.606	3.8	1.5	1.2	.5	10.5
2014–15	Philadelphia	19	15	21.9	.348	.323	.773	3.5	2.0	.7	.2	9.1
Career		857	842	34.1	.438	.370	.707	5.0	2.7	1.2	.4	17.1

=== Playoffs ===
Year	Team	GP	GS	MPG	FG%	3P%	FT%	RPG	APG	SPG	BPG	PPG
2007	Golden State	11	11	**38.9**	.476	.354	.704	**6.7**	**2.0**	**1.3**	**.5**	19.1
2010	Phoenix	**16**	**16**	33.3	**.502**	**.475**	.759	5.4	1.1	1.1	.3	**19.8**
2011	Orlando	5	5	30.6	.333	.320	**1.000**	4.0	1.2	.6	.4	10.0
2012	Orlando	5	5	29.6	.396	.370	.417	3.8	1.0	1.2	.4	11.4
Career		37	37	34.1	.465	.404	.724	5.4	1.4	1.1	.4	17.1
