= 2007–08 Charlotte Bobcats season =

NBA professional basketball team season

- Head coach: Sam Vincent
- President: Michael Jordan
- General manager: Rod Higgins
- Owner: Robert L. Johnson
- Arena: Time Warner Cable Arena

Results
- Record: 32–50 (.390)
- Place: Division: 4th (Southeast); Conference: 12th (Eastern)
- Playoff finish: Did not qualify
- Stats at Basketball Reference

Local media
- Television: News 14 Carolina, WMYT
- Radio: WOLS

The 2007–08 Charlotte Bobcats season was the 18th season of NBA basketball in Charlotte in the National Basketball Association (NBA), and their fourth as the Charlotte Bobcats.

Charlotte finished 32–50 for the season and didn't qualify for the playoffs. Despite a frenzy of offseason moves, including trading for Jason Richardson and hiring new coach Sam Vincent, the Bobcats were unable to build on their successful 33–49 season in 2007. As a result, Vincent was relieved of his duties soon after the season ended, and replaced by veteran hall of fame coach Larry Brown three days later.

== June to October: The offseason ==
=== 2007 NBA draft ===
On May 22, the Bobcats were assigned the 8th pick in the 2007 NBA Draft Lottery after finishing 33–49 the previous season. With their lottery pick, Charlotte selected power forward Brandan Wright out of North Carolina. The Bobcats then traded Wright for Golden State Warriors swingman Jason Richardson and the draft rights to Golden State's second round pick Jermareo Davidson (Alabama, 36th overall). Later in the first round, Charlotte selected Jared Dudley out of Boston College with the 22nd pick.

| Round | Pick | Player | Nationality | Position | School/Club team |
|---|---|---|---|---|---|
| 1 | 8 | Brandan Wright | United States | PF | North Carolina |
| 1 | 22 | Jared Dudley | United States | SF | Boston College |

=== Injuries and surgeries ===
The Bobcats lost the services of both Sean May and Adam Morrison prior to the season. After an exploratory procedure, it was determined that May needed season-ending microfracture surgery on his right knee. Morrison tore his anterior cruciate ligament (ACL) on October 20, 2007, in a preseason game against the Los Angeles Lakers.

=== Player departures ===
The Bobcats also waived team veteran Brevin Knight who was formerly the starting point guard but lost the job to Charlotte draft pick Raymond Felton. On December 14, 2007, the Bobcats said goodbye to original starting center Primož Brezec, and 2007 Second Team NBA All-Rookie selection Wálter Herrmann, trading them to the Detroit Pistons.

=== Staff changes ===
The Bobcats' most notable move in the off-season was the retirement of head coach Bernie Bickerstaff. Bickerstaff remained in the organization by becoming Executive Vice President of Basketball Operations. The Bobcats replaced him with Sam Vincent, former coach of the NBA Development League's Fort Worth Flyers. To complement Vincent, the organization hired assistants Dell Curry and Paul Mokeski to the coaching staff. Assistant coach John Outlaw was moved from his position to Player Programs/Director of Pro Player Personnel. The rest of the front office has been a key issue for the Bobcats during the 2007 offseason. Rod Higgins was hired on May 31, 2007, as general manager, assuming the same role he had with the Golden State Warriors. Phil Ford and Lee Rose were tapped to join Vincent's coaching staff on June 6, 2007. Buzz Peterson was hired from Coastal Carolina University, where he served as head basketball coach, to become director of player personnel on June 13, 2007.

== Roster ==
2007–08 Charlotte Bobcats roster
Players

| Pos. | No. | Player | Height | Weight | DOB | From |
|---|---|---|---|---|---|---|
| G | 1 | Derek Anderson | 6 ft 5 in (1.96 m) | 195 lb (88 kg) | | Kentucky |
| G | 11 | Earl Boykins | 5 ft 5 in (1.65 m) | 133 lb (60 kg) | | Eastern Michigan |
| SG | 13 | Matt Carroll | 6 ft 6 in (1.98 m) | 212 lb (96 kg) | | Notre Dame |
| PF | 33 | Jermareo Davidson | 6 ft 10 in (2.08 m) | 230 lb (104 kg) | | Alabama |
| F | 4 | Jared Dudley | 6 ft 7 in (2.01 m) | 225 lb (102 kg) | | Boston College |
| PG | 20 | Raymond Felton | 6 ft 1 in (1.85 m) | 198 lb (90 kg) | | North Carolina |
| F/C | 24 | Othella Harrington | 6 ft 9 in (2.06 m) | 235 lb (107 kg) | | Georgetown |
| C | 15 | Ryan Hollins | 7 ft 0 in (2.13 m) | 230 lb (104 kg) | | UCLA |
| F | 42 | Sean May | 6 ft 9 in (2.06 m) | 266 lb (121 kg) | | North Carolina |
| C | 6 | Nazr Mohammed | 6 ft 10 in (2.08 m) | 250 lb (113 kg) | | Kentucky |
| G/F | 35 | Adam Morrison | 6 ft 8 in (2.03 m) | 205 lb (93 kg) | | Gonzaga |
| F/C | 50 | Emeka Okafor | 6 ft 10 in (2.08 m) | 252 lb (114 kg) | | Connecticut |
| SG | 23 | Jason Richardson | 6 ft 6 in (1.98 m) | 225 lb (102 kg) | | Michigan State |
| G/F | 3 | Gerald Wallace | 6 ft 7 in (2.01 m) | 215 lb (98 kg) | | Alabama |

Coaches
Head coach
- Sam Vincent (Michigan State)
Assistant(s)
- Phil Ford (North Carolina)
- Jeff Capel (Fayetteville State)
- Paul Mokeski (Kansas)
- Lee Rose (Transylvania)
- Mike Sanders (UCLA)

Legend
- (DP) Unsigned draft pick
- (FA) Free agent
- (S) Suspended
- Injured

== Regular season ==
=== Standings ===
| Southeast Division | W | L | PCT | GB | Home | Road | Div |
|---|---|---|---|---|---|---|---|
| y-Orlando Magic | 52 | 30 | .634 | – | 25–16 | 27–14 | 12–4 |
| x-Washington Wizards | 43 | 39 | .500 | 9 | 25–16 | 18–23 | 10–6 |
| x-Atlanta Hawks | 37 | 45 | .451 | 15 | 25–16 | 12–29 | 9–7 |
| Charlotte Bobcats | 32 | 50 | .390 | 20 | 21–20 | 11–30 | 7–9 |
| Miami Heat | 15 | 67 | .183 | 37 | 9–32 | 6–35 | 2–14 |

Eastern Conference
| # | Team | W | L | PCT | GB |
|---|---|---|---|---|---|
| 1 | z-Boston Celtics | 66 | 16 | .805 | – |
| 2 | y-Detroit Pistons | 59 | 23 | .732 | 7 |
| 3 | y-Orlando Magic | 52 | 30 | .634 | 14 |
| 4 | x-Cleveland Cavaliers | 45 | 37 | .549 | 21 |
| 5 | x-Washington Wizards | 43 | 39 | .524 | 23 |
| 6 | x-Toronto Raptors | 41 | 41 | .500 | 25 |
| 7 | x-Philadelphia 76ers | 40 | 42 | .488 | 26 |
| 8 | x-Atlanta Hawks | 37 | 45 | .451 | 29 |
| 9 | Indiana Pacers | 36 | 46 | .439 | 30 |
| 10 | New Jersey Nets | 34 | 48 | .415 | 32 |
| 11 | Chicago Bulls | 33 | 49 | .402 | 33 |
| 12 | Charlotte Bobcats | 32 | 50 | .390 | 34 |
| 13 | Milwaukee Bucks | 26 | 56 | .317 | 40 |
| 14 | New York Knicks | 23 | 59 | .280 | 43 |
| 15 | Miami Heat | 15 | 67 | .183 | 51 |

=== Game log ===
2007–08 game log
Total: 32–50 (Home: 21–20; Road: 11–30)
November: 6–8 (home: 5–4; road: 1–4)

| Game | Date | Team | Score | High points | High rebounds | High assists | Location Attendance | Record |
|---|---|---|---|---|---|---|---|---|
| 1 | November 2 | Milwaukee | 102–99 | Raymond Felton (26) | Emeka Okafor (14) | Raymond Felton (12) | Time Warner Cable Arena; 16,368 | 1–0 |
| 2 | November 4 | @ Miami | 90–88 | Jason Richardson (29) | Emeka Okafor (13) | Raymond Felton (7) | American Airlines Arena; 19,600 | 2–0 |
| 3 | November 6 | Phoenix | 83–115 | Jared Dudley (16) | Jared Dudley (11) | Jeff McInnis (4) | Time Warner Cable Arena; 12,408 | 2–1 |
| 4 | November 7 | @ Philadelphia | 63–94 | Matt Carroll (16) | Emeka Okafor (11) | Derek Anderson (8) | Wachovia Center; 9,317 | 2–2 |
| 5 | November 9 | Indiana | 96–87 | Gerald Wallace (28) | Emeka Okafor (23) | Jeff McInnis (7) | Time Warner Cable Arena; 12,044 | 3–2 |
| 6 | November 11 | Houston | 82–85 | Matt Carroll (17) | Emeka Okafor (11) | Jeff McInnis (7) | Time Warner Cable Arena; 11,936 | 3–3 |
| 7 | November 13 | Miami | 94–76 | Gerald Wallace (19) | Emeka Okafor (10) | Raymond Felton (9) | Time Warner Cable Arena; 12,169 | 4–3 |
| 8 | November 14 | @ Atlanta | 109–117 | Jason Richardson, Gerald Wallace (27) | Emeka Okafor (8) | Jeff McInnis (6) | Philips Arena; 12,239 | 4–4 |
| 9 | November 17 | Seattle | 100–84 | Gerald Wallace (27) | Emeka Okafor (10) | Raymond Felton (12) | Time Warner Cable Arena; 13,697 | 5–4 |
| 10 | November 19 | Portland | 101–92 | Gerald Wallace (27) | Emeka Okafor (12) | Raymond Felton (10) | Time Warner Cable Arena; 10,612 | 6–4 |
| 11 | November 21 | Washington | 111–114 | Raymond Felton (27) | Emeka Okafor (14) | Raymond Felton (12) | Time Warner Cable Arena; 12,193 | 6–5 |
| 12 | November 23 | @ Orlando | 92–105 | Wálter Herrmann (16) | Emeka Okafor (18) | Raymond Felton, Jeff McInnis (6) | Amway Arena; 17,136 | 6–6 |
| 13 | November 24 | Boston | 95–96 | Jason Richardson (25) | Jared Dudley, Emeka Okafor, Jason Richardson (9) | Raymond Felton (9) | Time Warner Cable Arena; 19,201 | 6–7 |
| 14 | November 27 | @ Miami | 90–110 | Gerald Wallace (16) | Raymond Felton, Emeka Okafor (6) | Raymond Felton (7) | American Airlines Arena; 19,600 | 6–8 |

December: 5–10 (home: 5–4; road: 0–6)

| Game | Date | Team | Score | High points | High rebounds | High assists | Location Attendance | Record |
|---|---|---|---|---|---|---|---|---|
| 15 | December 1 | @ Chicago | 95–111 | Jason Richardson (22) | Emeka Okafor (9) | Gerald Wallace (7) | United Center; 21,729 | 6–9 |
| 16 | December 3 | @ Toronto | 79–98 | Gerald Wallace (19) | Jared Dudley (10) | Jeff McInnis (5) | Air Canada Centre; 17,439 | 6–10 |
| 17 | December 5 | Chicago | 82–91 | Gerald Wallace (22) | Emeka Okafor (10) | Raymond Felton (6) | Time Warner Cable Arena; 13,227 | 6–11 |
| 18 | November 6 | Cleveland | 96–93 | Gerald Wallace (22) | Jason Richardson (8) | Jason Richardson (6) | Time Warner Cable Arena; 17,624 | 7–11 |
| 19 | December 9 | @ Detroit | 82–91 | Jason Richardson (15) | Derek Anderson (5) | Raymond Felton (6) | Palace of Auburn Hills; 22,076 | 7–12 |
| 20 | December 12 | L.A. Clippers | 108–103 | Raymond Felton (26) | Emeka Okafor (16) | Jeff McInnis (8) | Time Warner Cable Arena; 10,751 | 8–12 |
| 21 | December 14 | Orlando | 82–91 | Raymond Felton (18) | Emeka Okafor (12) | Raymond Felton (6) | Time Warner Cable Arena; 19,109 | 8–13 |
| 22 | December 15 | @ Atlanta | 84–93 | Gerald Wallace (24) | Emeka Okafor (14) | Raymond Felton (5) | Philips Arena; 14,040 | 8–14 |
| 23 | December 19 | Utah | 98–92 | Gerald Wallace (26) | Emeka Okafor (9) | Raymond Felton (7) | Time Warner Cable Arena; 13,014 | 9–14 |
| 24 | December 21 | New York | 105–95 | Gerald Wallace (27) | Nazr Mohammed (14) | Raymond Felton (9) | Time Warner Cable Arena; 15,130 | 10–14 |
| 25 | December 22 | @ Milwaukee | 99–103 | Jason Richardson (30) | Nazr Mohammed (11) | Raymond Felton (9) | Bradley Center; 15,796 | 10–15 |
| 26 | December 26 | Washington | 104–108 | Gerald Wallace (32) | Nazr Mohammed (12) | Gerald Wallace (6) | Time Warner Cable Arena; 14,705 | 10–16 |
| 27 | December 28 | New Orleans | 85–99 | Jason Richardson (25) | Nazr Mohammed (14) | Jeff McInnis (6) | Time Warner Cable Arena; 18,237 | 10–17 |
| 28 | December 29 | @ Orlando | 92–104 | Jason Richardson (34) | Emeka Okafor (9) | Gerald Wallace (7) | Amway Arena; 17,519 | 10–18 |
| 29 | December 31 | Indiana | 107–103 (OT) | Gerald Wallace (36) | Emeka Okafor (10) | Raymond Felton (6) | Time Warner Cable Arena; 12,223 | 11–18 |

January: 7–10 (home: 4–6; road: 3–4)

| Game | Date | Team | Score | High points | High rebounds | High assists | Location Attendance | Record |
|---|---|---|---|---|---|---|---|---|
| 30 | January 2 | Chicago | 97–109 | Jason Richardson (28) | Gerald Wallace (11) | Raymond Felton (9) | Time Warner Cable Arena; 11,568 | 11–19 |
| 31 | January 4 | @ New Jersey | 96–103 | Jason Richardson (33) | Emeka Okafor (13) | Raymond Felton (8) | Izod Center; 15,276 | 11–20 |
| 32 | January 6 | Milwaukee | 89–93 | Gerald Wallace (25) | Nazr Mohammed (12) | Raymond Felton (10) | Time Warner Cable Arena; 10,884 | 11–21 |
| 33 | January 8 | New Jersey | 115–99 | Jason Richardson (25) | Gerald Wallace (11) | Raymond Felton (7) | Time Warner Cable Arena; 11,913 | 12–21 |
| 34 | January 9 | @ Boston | 95–83 | Jason Richardson (34) | Nazr Mohammed, Gerald Wallace (10) | Raymond Felton (8) | TD Banknorth Garden; 18,624 | 13–21 |
| 35 | January 11 | @ Cleveland | 103–113 (OT) | Gerald Wallace (27) | Nazr Mohammed (15) | Raymond Felton (11) | Quicken Loans Arena; 20,562 | 13–22 |
| 36 | January 12 | Detroit | 100–103 (OT) | Gerald Wallace (26) | Emeka Okafor (15) | Jason Richardson (8) | Time Warner Cable Arena; 19,091 | 13–23 |
| 37 | January 14 | Denver | 119–116 | Gerald Wallace (40) | Emeka Okafor (13) | Raymond Felton (15) | Time Warner Cable Arena; 14,543 | 14–23 |
| 38 | January 16 | Orlando | 99–93 | Gerald Wallace (36) | Gerald Wallace (14) | Jeff McInnis, Gerald Wallace (5) | Time Warner Cable Arena; 14,279 | 15–23 |
| 39 | January 18 | @ New Orleans | 84–112 | Emeka Okafor (13) | Nazr Mohammed (11) | Raymond Felton, Jeff McInnis (6) | New Orleans Arena; 12,986 | 15–24 |
| 40 | January 19 | Memphis | 105–87 | Jason Richardson (38) | Jason Richardson (14) | Raymond Felton (9) | Time Warner Cable Arena; 15,848 | 16–24 |
| 41 | January 21 | San Antonio | 86–95 | Emeka Okafor (10) | Emeka Okafor (10) | Jeff McInnis (9) | Time Warner Cable Arena; 17,124 | 16–25 |
| 42 | January 23 | Dallas | 95–102 | Jason Richardson, Gerald Wallace (22) | Gerald Wallace (11) | Raymond Felton (7) | Time Warner Cable Arena; 13,764 | 16–26 |
| 43 | January 25 | @ Chicago | 90–77 | Emeka Okafor, Gerald Wallace (21) | Emeka Okafor (16) | Felton (8) | United Center; 21,761 | 17–26 |
| 44 | January 26 | Philadelphia | 96–103 | Jason Richardson (35) | Emeka Okafor (16) | Gerald Wallace (10) | Time Warner Cable Arena; 18,074 | 17–27 |
| 45 | January 28 | @ L.A. Clippers | 107–100 | Gerald Wallace (23) | Emeka Okafor (9) | Raymond Felton, Gerald Wallace (8) | Staples Center; 14,429 | 18–27 |
| 46 | January 30 | @ Sacramento | 91–105 | Gerald Wallace (25) | Emeka Okafor (15) | Raymond Felton (7) | ARCO Arena; 12,627 | 18–28 |

February: 1–11 (home: 1–3; road: 0–8)

| Game | Date | Team | Score | High points | High rebounds | High assists | Location Attendance | Record |
|---|---|---|---|---|---|---|---|---|
| 47 | February 1 | @ Golden State | 96–127 | Emeka Okafor (20) | Emeka Okafor (18) | Jared Dudley, Jeff McInnis, Jason Richardson, Gerald Wallace (4) | Oracle Arena; 20,064 | 18–29 |
| 48 | February 2 | @ Denver | 101–117 | Jason Richardson (38) | Emeka Okafor (13) | Raymond Felton (9) | Pepsi Center; 19,391 | 18–30 |
| 49 | February 4 | @ Phoenix | 104–118 | Jason Richardson (25) | Emeka Okafor (13) | Jeff McInnis (5) | US Airways Center; 18,422 | 18–31 |
| 50 | February 8 | New Jersey | 90–104 | Gerald Wallace (21) | Emeka Okafor (17) | Nazr Mohammed, Jason Richardson (3) | Time Warner Cable Arena; 16,319 | 18–32 |
| 51 | February 10 | @ Detroit | 87–113 | Jason Richardson (27) | Emeka Okafor (9) | Jeff McInnis, Jason Richardson (5) | Palace of Auburn Hills; 22,076 | 18–33 |
| 52 | February 11 | L.A. Lakers | 97–106 | Raymond Felton (29) | Emeka Okafor (13) | Raymond Felton (8) | Time Warner Cable Arena; 19,270 | 18–34 |
| 53 | February 13 | Atlanta | 100–98 (OT) | Raymond Felton (22) | Emeka Okafor (21) | Raymond Felton (7) | Time Warner Cable Arena; 11,213 | 19–34 |
| 54 | February 19 | @ San Antonio | 65–85 | Raymond Felton (19) | Emeka Okafor (10) | Raymond Felton, Jason Richardson (4) | AT&T Center; 18,383 | 19–35 |
| 55 | February 22 | Sacramento | 115–116 | Jason Richardson (29) | Emeka Okafor (7) | Raymond Felton (10) | Time Warner Cable Arena; 16,842 | 19–36 |
| 56 | February 23 | @ Washington | 95–110 | Jason Richardson (25) | Emeka Okafor (13) | Raymond Felton (9) | Verizon Center; 20,173 | 19–37 |
| 57 | February 27 | @ New York | 89–113 | Emeka Okafor (18) | Emeka Okafor (14) | Raymond Felton (5) | Madison Square Garden; 18,076 | 19–38 |
| 58 | February 29 | @ Boston | 100–108 | Jason Richardson (30) | Jared Dudley, Raymond Felton, Nazr Mohammed, Emeka Okafor (7) | Felton (10) | TD Banknorth Garden; 18,624 | 19–39 |

March: 9–7 (home: 4–1; road: 5–6)

| Game | Date | Team | Score | High points | High rebounds | High assists | Location Attendance | Record |
|---|---|---|---|---|---|---|---|---|
| 59 | March 2 | Toronto | 110–98 | Jason Richardson (30) | Emeka Okafor (15) | Raymond Felton (8) | Time Warner Cable Arena; 12,083 | 20–39 |
| 60 | March 4 | @ Minnesota | 109–89 | Jason Richardson (25) | Emeka Okafor (11) | Raymond Felton (10) | Target Center; 10,019 | 21–39 |
| 61 | March 5 | Golden State | 118–109 | Jason Richardson (42) | Jared Dudley (18) | Raymond Felton (6) | Time Warner Cable Arena; 13,747 | 22–39 |
| 62 | March 7 | Atlanta | 108–93 | Raymond Felton (23) | Emeka Okafor (15) | Raymond Felton (11) | Time Warner Cable Arena; 15,203 | 23–39 |
| 63 | March 8 | @ Wizards | 100–97 | Jason Richardson (34) | Emeka Okafor (9) | Raymond Felton (12) | Verizon Center; 20,173 | 24–39 |
| 64 | March 12 | @ Dallas | 93–118 | Raymond Felton (21) | Emeka Okafor (11) | Raymond Felton (6) | American Airlines Center; 20,279 | 24–40 |
| 65 | March 14 | @ Houston | 80–89 | Jason Richardson (28) | Nazr Mohammed, Emeka Okafor (9) | Jason Richardson (5) | Toyota Center; 18,265 | 24–41 |
| 66 | March 16 | @ Cleveland | 91–98 | Jason Richardson (33) | Nazr Mohammed, Emeka Okafor (12) | Raymond Felton (9) | Quicken Loans Arena; 20,562 | 24–42 |
| 67 | March 17 | @ Memphis | 80–98 | Derek Anderson (17) | Nazr Mohammed, Emeka Okafor (7) | Earl Boykins (5) | FedEx Forum; 10,971 | 24–43 |
| 68 | March 19 | @ Indiana | 95–102 | Jason Richardson (20) | Jason Richardson (10) | Jason Richardson (8) | Conseco Fieldhouse; 10,813 | 24–44 |
| 69 | March 22 | Miami | 94–82 | Gerald Wallace (26) | Nazr Mohammed (14) | Raymond Felton (10) | Time Warner Cable Arena; 17,522 | 25–44 |
| 70 | March 25 | @ Utah | 106–128 | Jason Richardson (26) | Jared Dudley, Nazr Mohammed, Jason Richardson (5) | Raymond Felton (6) | EnergySolutions Arena; 19,911 | 25–45 |
| 71 | March 26 | @ L.A. Lakers | 108–95 | Jason Richardson (34) | Emeka Okafor (11) | Raymond Felton (10) | Staples Center; 18,997 | 26–45 |
| 72 | March 28 | @ Seattle | 96–93 | Jason Richardson (27) | Emeka Okafor (9) | Raymond Felton (6) | KeyArena; 13,592 | 27–45 |
| 73 | March 29 | @ Portland | 93–85 | Emeka Okafor (21) | Matt Carroll (7) | Raymond Felton (9) | Rose Garden; 19,980 | 28–45 |
| 74 | March 31 | Toronto | 100–104 | Jason Richardson (26) | Emeka Okafor (12) | Raymond Felton (10) | Time Warner Cable Arena; 12,188 | 28–46 |

April: 4–4 (home: 2–2; road: 2–2)

| Game | Date | Team | Score | High points | High rebounds | High assists | Location Attendance | Record |
|---|---|---|---|---|---|---|---|---|
| 75 | April 2 | Cleveland | 114–118 | Jason Richardson (31) | Emeka Okafor (9) | Raymond Felton (9) | Time Warner Cable Arena; 15,106 | 28–47 |
| 76 | April 4 | @ Toronto | 105–100 | Jason Richardson (27) | Emeka Okafor (13) | Earl Boykins (8) | Air Canada Centre; 19,800 | 29–47 |
| 77 | April 5 | Boston | 78–101 | Emeka Okafor (17) | Emeka Okafor (8) | Raymond Felton (10) | Time Warner Cable Arena; 19,403 | 29–48 |
| 78 | April 8 | Minnesota | 121–119 | Jason Richardson (36) | Nazr Mohammed (8) | Raymond Felton (11) | Time Warner Cable Arena; 15,728 | 30–48 |
| 79 | April 9 | @ New York | 107–109 | Jason Richardson (25) | Jason Richardson (10) | Raymond Felton (8) | Madison Square Garden; 18,943 | 30–49 |
| 80 | April 12 | @ Indiana | 107–103 | Jason Richardson (26) | Emeka Okafor (18) | Raymond Felton (12) | Conseco Fieldhouse; 14,265 | 31–49 |
| 81 | April 15 | @ New Jersey | 108–112 | Jason Richardson (31) | Emeka Okafor (15) | Raymond Felton (8) | Izod Center; 14,532 | 31–50 |
| 82 | April 16 | Philadelphia | 115–109 | Jason Richardson (29) | Emeka Okafor (9) | Raymond Felton (12) | Time Warner Cable Arena; 17,043 | 32–50 |

2007–08 season schedule

== Player statistics ==
=== Ragular season ===
| Player | POS | GP | GS | MP | REB | AST | STL | BLK | PTS | MPG | RPG | APG | SPG | BPG | PPG |
|---|---|---|---|---|---|---|---|---|---|---|---|---|---|---|---|
| Jason Richardson | SF | 82 | 82 | 3,149 | 441 | 258 | 116 | 57 | 1,788 | 38.4 | 5.4 | 3.1 | 1.4 | .7 | 21.8 |
| Emeka Okafor | C | 82 | 82 | 2,718 | 876 | 70 | 62 | 138 | 1,133 | 33.1 | 10.7 | .9 | .8 | 1.7 | 13.8 |
| Matt Carroll | SG | 80 | 18 | 2,016 | 226 | 73 | 46 | 19 | 720 | 25.2 | 2.8 | .9 | .6 | .2 | 9.0 |
| Raymond Felton | PG | 79 | 79 | 2,972 | 236 | 583 | 96 | 12 | 1,140 | 37.6 | 3.0 | 7.4 | 1.2 | .2 | 14.4 |
| Jared Dudley | PF | 73 | 14 | 1,384 | 286 | 81 | 55 | 10 | 422 | 19.0 | 3.9 | 1.1 | .8 | .1 | 5.8 |
| Gerald Wallace | PF | 62 | 59 | 2,376 | 373 | 216 | 131 | 58 | 1,200 | 38.3 | 6.0 | 3.5 | 2.1 | .9 | 19.4 |
| Nazr Mohammed^{†} | C | 61 | 29 | 1,422 | 421 | 66 | 38 | 52 | 570 | 23.3 | 6.9 | 1.1 | .6 | .9 | 9.3 |
| Ryan Hollins | PF | 60 | 1 | 532 | 107 | 14 | 10 | 30 | 147 | 8.9 | 1.8 | .2 | .2 | .5 | 2.5 |
| Jeff McInnis | PG | 54 | 26 | 1,410 | 96 | 220 | 23 | 3 | 242 | 26.1 | 1.8 | 4.1 | .4 | .1 | 4.5 |
| Jermareo Davidson | SF | 38 | 2 | 322 | 62 | 13 | 7 | 15 | 120 | 8.5 | 1.6 | .3 | .2 | .4 | 3.2 |
| Earl Boykins | PG | 36 | 0 | 577 | 34 | 96 | 13 | 0 | 185 | 16.0 | .9 | 2.7 | .4 | .0 | 5.1 |
| Derek Anderson | SG | 28 | 0 | 396 | 52 | 44 | 12 | 1 | 141 | 14.1 | 1.9 | 1.6 | .4 | .0 | 5.0 |
| Othella Harrington | C | 22 | 0 | 166 | 42 | 4 | 1 | 4 | 46 | 7.5 | 1.9 | .2 | .0 | .2 | 2.1 |
| Primož Brezec^{†} | C | 20 | 18 | 267 | 44 | 6 | 0 | 3 | 37 | 13.4 | 2.2 | .3 | .0 | .2 | 1.9 |
| Walter Herrmann^{†} | PF | 17 | 0 | 174 | 36 | 4 | 4 | 0 | 68 | 10.2 | 2.1 | .2 | .2 | .0 | 4.0 |

- ^{†} Denotes player spent time with another team in the season. Stats reflect time with the Bobcats only.

== Awards, records and milestones ==
=== Awards ===
==== Week/Month ====
- Jason Richardson was named the Eastern Conference Player of the Week for games played from March 3 through March 9.
- Jason Richardson was named the Eastern Conference Player of the Week for games played from March 24 through March 30.

=== Records ===
- Jason Richardson and Emeka Okafor set a single-season mark for games played by a Bobcat in a season with 82.
- Jason Richardson made 243 three-pointers, the fourth most in NBA history in a single season and a Bobcats franchise record.

=== Milestones ===
- Five-game winning streak, the longest in franchise history from March 2 through March 8.

== Transactions ==
The Bobcats were involved in the following transactions during the 2007–08 season:

=== Trades ===
| June 28, 2007 | To Charlotte Bobcats Jason Richardson, Jermareo Davidson | To Golden State Warriors Brandan Wright |
| December 14, 2007 | To Charlotte Bobcats Nazr Mohammed | To Detroit Pistons Primož Brezec, Wálter Herrmann |

=== Free agents ===
==== Additions ====
| Player | Signed | Former team |
| Jake Voskuhl | | Milwaukee Bucks |

==== Subtractions ====
| Player | Left | New team |

== See also ==
- 2007–08 NBA season
