= Raja Bell =

American basketball player (born 1976)

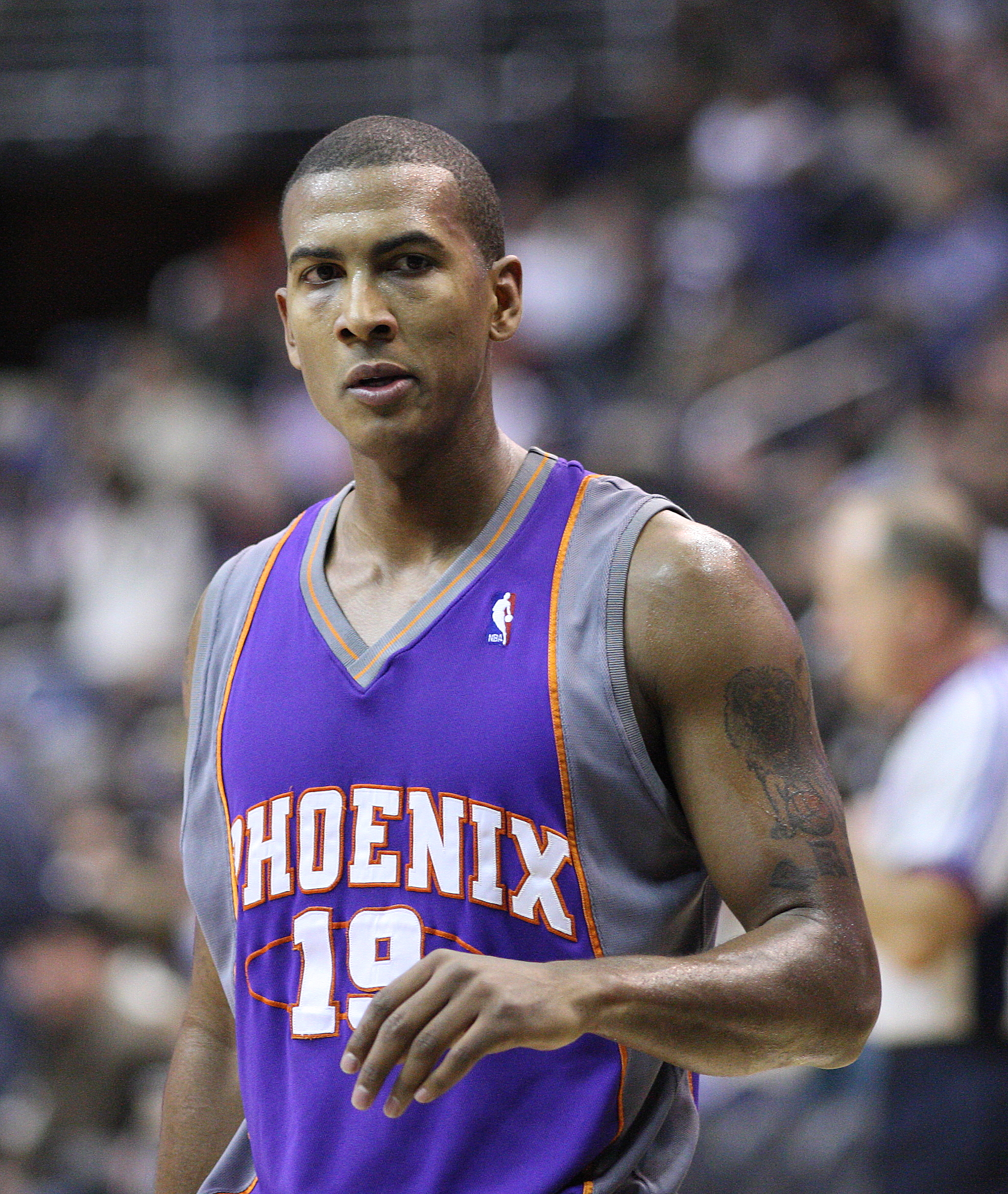
- Bell with the Phoenix Suns in 2007

Personal information
- Born: September 19, 1976 (age 50) Saint Croix, U.S. Virgin Islands
- Listed height: 6 ft 5 in (1.96 m)
- Listed weight: 210 lb (95 kg)

Career information
- High school: Miami Killian (Miami, Florida)
- College: Boston University (1994–1996); FIU (1997–1999)
- NBA draft: 1999: undrafted
- Playing career: 1999–2013
- Position: Shooting guard
- Number: 19, 11, 18

Career history
- 1999–2000: Yakima Sun Kings
- 2001–2002: Philadelphia 76ers
- 2002–2003: Dallas Mavericks
- 2003–2005: Utah Jazz
- 2005–2008: Phoenix Suns
- 2008–2009: Charlotte Bobcats
- 2009–2010: Golden State Warriors
- 2010–2013: Utah Jazz

Career highlights
- NBA All-Defensive First Team (2007); NBA All-Defensive Second Team (2008); CBA champion (2000); CBA All-Rookie Team (2000); First-team All-TAAC (1998); North Atlantic Conference Rookie of the Year (1995)

Career NBA statistics
- Points: 6,998 (9.9 ppg)
- Rebounds: 1,968 (2.8 rpg)
- Assists: 1,208 (1.7 apg)
- Stats at NBA.com
- Stats at Basketball Reference

Raja Dia Bell (born September 19, 1976) is an American former professional basketball player and podcaster. He played in the National Basketball Association (NBA) for the Philadelphia 76ers, Dallas Mavericks, Utah Jazz, Phoenix Suns, Charlotte Bobcats, and Golden State Warriors. He was twice named to the NBA All-Defensive Team.

Bell spent the 2014–15 season as the director of player development for the Cleveland Cavaliers. He is now a podcast host for The Ringer.

== Early life and college career ==
Bell was born on Saint Croix in the U.S. Virgin Islands. He grew up in the greater Miami, Florida, area, attending Ponce de Leon Junior High School, Gulliver Academy, and Miami Killian Senior High School. He began his college career at Boston University, where he was America East Conference (then called North Atlantic Conference) Freshman of the Year. After his sophomore year, Bell left Boston University for reasons unrelated to basketball. He transferred to Florida International University (FIU) in Miami for his junior and senior seasons. Bell went undrafted out of college in the 1999 NBA draft.

== Professional playing career ==
=== Yakima Sun Kings (1999–2000) ===
Bell began his professional career with the Yakima Sun Kings of the Continental Basketball Association (CBA). He won a CBA championship with the Sun Kings in 2000. He was selected to the CBA All-Rookie Team in 2000.

=== Philadelphia 76ers (2001–2002) ===
Bell signed as a free agent with the San Antonio Spurs on August 2, 2000, but never played a game for them. He was eventually released, and then signed the first of two 10 day contracts with the Philadelphia 76ers on April 6, 2001. Bell later signed a contract for the rest of the season after the two 10 day contracts expired. He played limited minutes in the final five of the Sixers' games in the 2000–01 regular season, but saw action in 15 of the team's 23 playoff games. The little-used Bell starred in Game 7 of the 2001 Eastern Conference Finals, scoring 10 points (all in the 2nd quarter) and rallying the Sixers from an early deficit against the Bucks as the 76ers won easily. He played in all five games for the 76ers in the 2001 NBA Finals.

Bell played in 74 games with the Sixers in the 2001–02 NBA season, averaging 3.4 points per game, and played in three of the team's five playoff games as the Sixers suffered a five-game playoff series loss to the Boston Celtics.

=== Dallas Mavericks (2002–2003) ===
On October 1, 2002, Bell signed as a free agent with the Dallas Mavericks, and he averaged 3.1 points in 15.6 minutes per game. For the first time in his NBA career, he gained extensive starting experience, starting in 32 of the 75 games he played.

Bell averaged 5.7 points and 3.0 rebounds per game in 17 post-season games with the 2003 Mavericks as the team advanced to the Western Conference Finals.

=== Utah Jazz (2003–2005) ===
On September 26, 2003, Bell signed with the Utah Jazz, and enjoyed what had been his most successful season since entering the NBA. Bell played in all 82 of the Jazz's games, and despite starting in only four of them, he posted career highs with 11.2 points, 2.9 rebounds, 1.3 assists and 24.6 minutes per game. In the 2004–05 season he slightly improved upon these stats with 12.3 points, 3.2 rebounds, and 1.4 assists per game, despite playing in only 63 games.

=== Phoenix Suns (2005–2008) ===
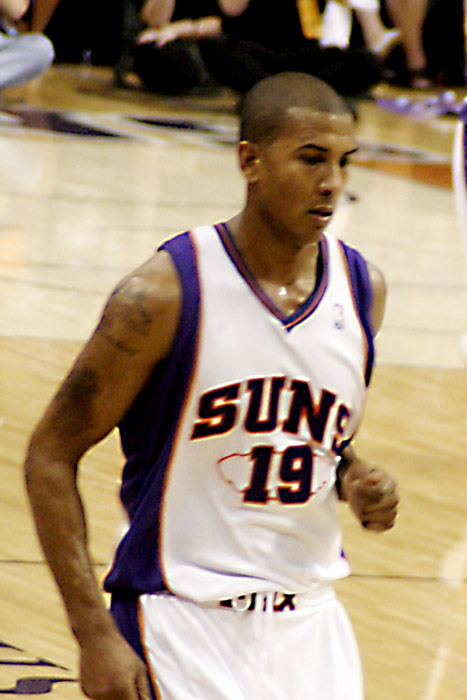
Bell with the Phoenix Suns in 2008

On August 3, 2005, Bell signed with the Phoenix Suns. Bell responded to the presence of Steve Nash and became an extremely solid contributor. He started in all 79 games he played in, and finished the 2005–06 season averaging 14.7 points per game in 37.5 minutes per game.

Bell also hit a career high 44.2% of his 3-point field goal attempts during the 2005–06 season. He was chosen to participate in the 2006 NBA Footlocker Three-Point Shootout, but did not participate due to a family illness and was replaced by Gilbert Arenas.

One of the most notable incidents of Bell's career occurred in the 2006 NBA Playoffs on May 2, 2006, in Game 5 of a first round series against the Los Angeles Lakers. Bell clotheslined Lakers star guard Kobe Bryant on a hard foul, resulting in an ejection (with 7:33 left to play in the game). In the postgame press conference, Bell explained that he was retaliating to an elbow to the jaw from Bryant. "It's a personal thing when someone continually hits you in the face... There doesn't seem to be any boundaries or limitations for what he's allowed to do to me, and at that point, I kind of lost my cool and I took it into my own hands." Bell was suspended for one game after his clothesline. The Suns eventually won the series in 7 games.

During the next round of the 2006 NBA Playoffs, Bell demonstrated his clutch abilities in Game 5 with a last second three-pointer in overtime against the Los Angeles Clippers to tie the game and send it into double-overtime, where the Suns eventually pulled away to win and go up 3 to 2 in the series. In Game 1 of the Western Conference Finals against the Dallas Mavericks, midway through the fourth quarter, Bell sustained a calf injury which forced him to miss the rest of the game, as well as the next two games of the series. Bell returned in Game 4 to help the Suns tie the series at two games apiece, though they eventually fell to the Mavericks.

On January 5, 2007, Bell was suspended one game without pay for kicking Andrea Bargnani in a road game against the Toronto Raptors.

Bell finished the 2006–07 season with 205 total three-point shots made, tying the Washington Wizards' Gilbert Arenas for the league lead.

=== Charlotte Bobcats (2008–2009) ===
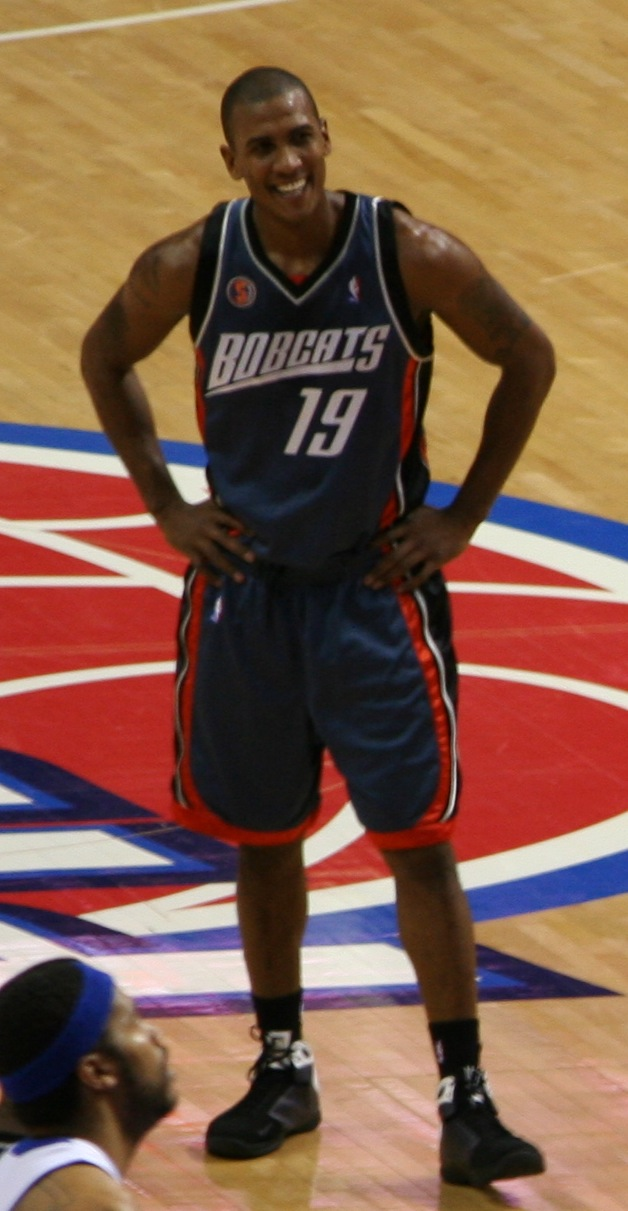
Bell with the Charlotte Bobcats in 2009

On December 10, 2008, Bell was traded to the Charlotte Bobcats along with Boris Diaw and Sean Singletary in exchange for Jason Richardson, Jared Dudley and a 2010 second-round draft pick in a move by the Suns to retool their roster. This came after a disappointing start to the season for Bell during which he posted just 9.6 points per game and saw a diminished role under new coach Terry Porter.

=== Golden State Warriors (2009–2010) ===
On November 16, 2009, Bell was traded to the Golden State Warriors along with Vladimir Radmanović in exchange for Stephen Jackson and Acie Law. He played just one game for the Warriors; in his lone performance scoring 11 points while hitting all three of his three-point attempts. He was released from the team on March 22, 2010. Bell's trade to the Warriors notably cleared the way for Steph Curry to be the long-term point guard for Golden State, as he had previously been benched for Acie Law.

=== Return to Utah (2010–2013) ===
On July 14, 2010, Bell signed a three-year, $10 million contract to return to the Utah Jazz. However, his relationship with the team soured after two seasons. In a mutual agreement, he spent much of the 2012–13 season away from the team while still under contract. On March 10, 2013, Bell was waived by the Jazz.

=== Retirement ===
On February 13, 2014, Bell announced his retirement from basketball.

== Post-playing career ==
=== Executive ===
On October 1, 2014, the Cleveland Cavaliers announced the hiring of Bell as the team's Director of Player Administration. He left the role in September, 2015, citing a desire to spend more time with his family.

=== Sports media ===
In August 2020, Bell began hosting episodes of The Ringer NBA Show with Logan Murdock.

== Personal life and family ==
In July 2004, Bell married his girlfriend, Cindy Greenman. On May 2, 2007, Cindy gave birth to their first child, Dia, by c-section six hours before tip-off of Game 5 against the Los Angeles Lakers in the 1st round of the 2007 NBA Playoffs. The Suns won that game 119–110, closing the series at 4–1. His wife gave birth to another child, Tai Brooklyn, on November 8, 2008.

Bell has one sibling, Tombi Bell, a former WNBA basketball player who attended the University of Florida and is a former assistant coach of the Miami Hurricanes women's basketball team.

Bell has been a vegetarian since the age of 2.

On June 17, 2024, Raja's son, Dia, announced his commitment to play football for the University of Texas at Austin. He is one of the top quarterbacks in the 2026 high school recruiting rankings.

=== Social media ===
In 2014, Bell began posting on Instagram under the username Rajadia19, a verified account.

In July 2020, Bell created a Twitter account with the username RajaBell19, a nod to the number he wore most often as an NBA player. As of early July 2022, more than two years of actively campaigning, Raja has not received verification from Twitter.

== NBA career statistics ==
Legend
GP	Games played	GS	Games started	MPG	Minutes per game
FG%	Field goal percentage	3P%	3-point field goal percentage	FT%	Free throw percentage
RPG	Rebounds per game	APG	Assists per game	SPG	Steals per game
BPG	Blocks per game	PPG	Points per game	**Bold**	Career high

=== Regular season ===
Year	Team	GP	GS	MPG	FG%	3P%	FT%	RPG	APG	SPG	BPG	PPG
2000–01	Philadelphia	5	0	6.0	.286	.333	.000	.2	.0	.2	.0	1.0
2001–02	Philadelphia	74	12	12.0	.429	.273	.750	1.5	1.0	.3	.1	3.4
2002–03	Dallas	75	32	15.6	.441	.412	.676	1.9	.8	.7	.1	3.1
2003–04	Utah	**82**	4	24.6	.409	.373	.786	2.9	1.3	.8	.2	11.2
2004–05	Utah	63	32	28.4	.454	.403	.747	3.2	1.4	.7	.1	12.3
2005–06	Phoenix	79	**79**	**37.5**	**.457**	.442	.788	3.2	**2.6**	**1.0**	.3	**14.7**
2006–07	Phoenix	78	78	37.4	.432	.413	.776	3.2	2.5	.6	.3	**14.7**
2007–08	Phoenix	75	75	35.3	.421	.401	.868	3.7	2.2	.7	**.4**	11.9
2008–09	Phoenix	22	22	32.4	.429	.468	.762	2.9	1.3	.6	.1	9.6
2008–09	Charlotte	45	44	35.6	.440	.395	.877	**4.0**	2.5	.8	.1	13.0
2009–10	Charlotte	5	5	31.4	.436	.375	**1.000**	**4.2**	2.0	.8	.4	12.0
2009–10	Golden State	1	0	23.0	**.667**	**1.000**	.000	2.0	3.0	.0	.0	11.0
2010–11	Utah	68	63	30.8	.409	.352	.892	2.6	1.7	.8	.2	8.0
2011–12	Utah	34	33	23.4	.466	.391	.840	1.4	1.1	.4	.1	6.4
Career		706	479	28.1	.434	.406	.799	2.8	1.7	.7	.2	9.9

=== Playoffs ===
Year	Team	GP	GS	MPG	FG%	3P%	FT%	RPG	APG	SPG	BPG	PPG
2001	Philadelphia	15	0	8.3	.444	.250	.571	.9	.5	**1.0**	.0	2.3
2002	Philadelphia	3	0	2.7	.333	.000	.000	.3	.0	.0	.0	.7
2003	Dallas	**17**	7	17.9	.548	.462	.550	3.0	1.6	.3	.0	5.7
2006	Phoenix	**17**	**17**	39.6	.479	.465	.829	2.8	**2.2**	.6	**.2**	**13.6**
2007	Phoenix	11	11	39.8	.460	.444	**.857**	3.0	1.8	.9	**.2**	10.2
2008	Phoenix	5	5	**43.0**	**.568**	**.650**	.813	**5.6**	**2.2**	.4	**.2**	**13.6**
Career		68	40	25.9	.492	.466	.743	2.6	1.5	.6	.1	8.0

== See also ==
- List of National Basketball Association career 3-point field goal percentage leaders
