= 2008–09 Phoenix Suns season =

NBA team season

- Head coach: Terry Porter; Alvin Gentry
- President: Steve Kerr
- General manager: Steve Kerr
- Owner: Robert Sarver
- Arena: US Airways Center

Results
- Record: 46–36 (.561)
- Place: Division: 2nd (Pacific); Conference: 9th (Western)
- Playoff finish: Did not qualify
- Stats at Basketball Reference

Local media
- Television: Fox Sports Arizona, KUTP
- Radio: KTAR

The 2008–09 Phoenix Suns season was the 41st season of the franchise in the National Basketball Association (NBA). The season was to be a promising one, filled with All-Star talent at several positions. It was believed over the offseason, the Suns would be able to better incorporate Shaquille O'Neal, who necessitated changes to both the offense and defense after being obtained in a trade one season ago. It was also the first season head coach Terry Porter had been able to use the summer to implement his defensive approach for a team which had in seasons past scored a large number of their points off fast breaks and early in the shot clock. Sensing a need for change, team management traded for scorer Jason Richardson in December, but this did not appear to immediately reinvigorate an offense that had recently led the league in points per game. However, after Phoenix went 28–23 to start the season, Suns assistant Alvin Gentry was named to replace Porter as head coach. Less than one week after the All-Star Game, Amar'e Stoudemire sustained a season-ending eye injury while the improvement of the team never fully came. The Suns finished 46–36, second in the Pacific division but out the playoffs for the first time since Steve Nash rejoined the Suns in the 2004–05 season. The Suns had the best team offensive rating in the NBA.

== Key dates ==
- June 26: The 2008 NBA draft took place in New York City.
- July 1: The free agency period started.
- October 1: Starting power forward Amar'e Stoudemire sustained a partially torn iris.
- October 8: The pre-season started with a game against the Atlanta Hawks.
- October 29: The regular season started with a game against the San Antonio Spurs.
- February 14–15: Phoenix hosted the 2009 NBA All-Star Weekend.
- February 16: The Suns fired coach Terry Porter and named Alvin Gentry interim coach.
- February 20: Stoudemire underwent surgery for a detached retina and was out for eight weeks after an injury sustained on February 18.

== Offseason ==
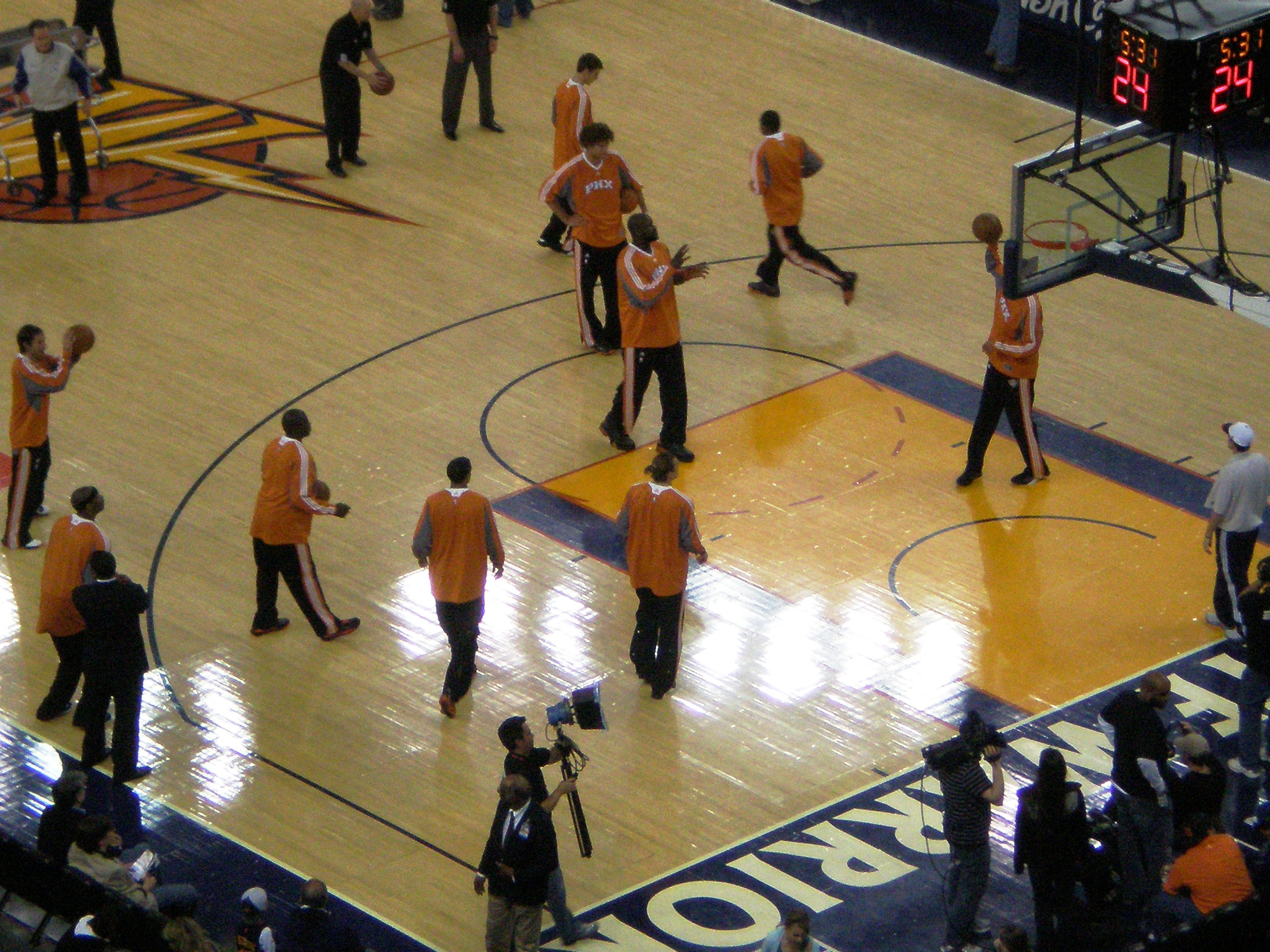
The 2008–09 Suns warming up during a road game against the Golden State Warriors in March 2009.

- June 7: Terry Porter was named as the Suns' new head coach.
- June 20: Alvin Gentry, Bill Cartwright, Dan Majerle and Igor Kokoskov were named as the Suns' new assistant coaches.
- June 26: Forward Grant Hill has exercised his player option for the 2008–09 season.
- June 26: Suns have acquired the draft rights to the rookie point guard Goran Dragić from San Antonio Spurs.
- July 10: Suns have signed center Robin Lopez, selected with the 15th overall pick in the 2008 NBA draft.
- July 22: Free agent forward Matt Barnes has signed with the Suns.
- August 14: Free agent forward Louis Amundson has signed with the Suns.
- August 25: Suns have acquired rookie guard Sean Singletary from the Houston Rockets in exchange for guard D. J. Strawberry.
- September 22: Suns have signed Goran Dragić.
- October 23: The Phoenix Suns have exercised the team's option on swingman Alando Tucker for the 2009–10 season.

=== NBA draft ===
Round	Pick	Player	Position	Nationality	College
1	15	Robin Lopez	Center	United States	Stanford
2	48	Malik Hairston	Guard	United States	Oregon

== Roster ==
2008–09 Phoenix Suns roster
Players

Pos.	No.	Player	Height	Weight	DOB	From
PF	17	Louis Amundson	6 ft 9 in (2.06 m)	238 lb (108 kg)	1982-12-07	UNLV
G	10	Leandro Barbosa	6 ft 3 in (1.91 m)	202 lb (92 kg)	1982-11-28	Brazil
F	22	Matt Barnes	6 ft 7 in (2.01 m)	226 lb (103 kg)	1980-03-09	UCLA
G	2	Goran Dragić	6 ft 3 in (1.91 m)	190 lb (86 kg)	1986-05-06	Slovenia
F	3	Jared Dudley	6 ft 7 in (2.01 m)	225 lb (102 kg)	1985-07-10	Boston College
SF	33	Grant Hill	6 ft 8 in (2.03 m)	225 lb (102 kg)	1972-10-05	Duke
C	15	Robin Lopez	7 ft 0 in (2.13 m)	255 lb (116 kg)	1988-04-01	Stanford
PG	13	Steve Nash	6 ft 3 in (1.91 m)	178 lb (81 kg)	1974-02-07	Santa Clara
C	32	Shaquille O'Neal	7 ft 1 in (2.16 m)	325 lb (147 kg)	1972-03-06	LSU
SG	23	Jason Richardson	6 ft 6 in (1.98 m)	225 lb (102 kg)	1981-01-20	Michigan State
F/C	1	Amar'e Stoudemire	6 ft 10 in (2.08 m)	249 lb (113 kg)	1982-11-16	Cypress Creek HS (FL)
F	4	Stromile Swift	6 ft 9 in (2.06 m)	225 lb (102 kg)	1979-11-21	LSU
F	29	Alando Tucker	6 ft 6 in (1.98 m)	205 lb (93 kg)	1984-02-11	Wisconsin

Coaches
Head coach
- Terry Porter
- Alvin Gentry
Assistant(s)
- Bill Cartwright
- Igor Kokoškov
- Dan Majerle

Legend
- (DP) Unsigned draft pick
- (FA) Free agent
- (S) Suspended
- Injured

Roster
Updated: March 4, 2009

== Regular season ==
=== Standings ===
Pacific Division	W	L	PCT	GB	Home	Road	Div	GP
c-Los Angeles Lakers	65	17	.793	—	36–5	29–12	14–2	82
Phoenix Suns	46	36	.561	19	28–13	18–23	11–5	82
Golden State Warriors	29	53	.354	36	21–20	8–33	6–10	82
Los Angeles Clippers	19	63	.232	46	11–30	8–33	2–14	82
Sacramento Kings	17	65	.207	48	11–30	6–35	7–9	82

#	Western Conference				
#	Team	W	L	PCT	GB
1	c-Los Angeles Lakers	65	17	.793	—
2	y-Denver Nuggets	54	28	.659	11
3	y-San Antonio Spurs	54	28	.659	11
4	x-Portland Trail Blazers	54	28	.659	11
5	x-Houston Rockets	53	29	.646	12
6	x-Dallas Mavericks	50	32	.610	15
7	x-New Orleans Hornets	49	33	.598	16
8	x-Utah Jazz	48	34	.585	17
9	Phoenix Suns	46	36	.561	19
10	Golden State Warriors	29	53	.354	36
11	Memphis Grizzlies	24	58	.293	41
12	Minnesota Timberwolves	24	58	.293	41
13	Oklahoma City Thunder	23	59	.280	42
14	Los Angeles Clippers	19	63	.232	46
15	Sacramento Kings	17	65	.207	48

=== Game log ===
2008–09 game log
October: 1–1 (home: 0–1; road: 1–0)

Game	Date	Team	Score	High points	High rebounds	High assists	Location Attendance	Record
1	October 29	@ San Antonio	W 103–98	Amar'e Stoudemire (22)	Shaquille O'Neal (13)	Steve Nash (13)	AT&T Center; 18,797	1–0
2	October 30	New Orleans	L 95–108	Steve Nash (24)	Amar'e Stoudemire (12)	Steve Nash (9)	US Airways Center; 18,422	1–1

November: 10–6 (home: 4–4; road: 6–2)

Game	Date	Team	Score	High points	High rebounds	High assists	Location Attendance	Record
3	November 1	Portland	W 107–96	Amar'e Stoudemire (23)	Amar'e Stoudemire (13)	Steve Nash (7)	US Airways Center; 18,422	2–1
4	November 4	@ New Jersey	W 114–86	Raja Bell (22)	Matt Barnes (7)	Steve Nash (11)	Izod Center; 15,230	3–1
5	November 5	@ Indiana	W 113–103	Amar'e Stoudemire (49)	Amar'e Stoudemire (11)	Amar'e Stoudemire, Steve Nash (6)	Conseco Fieldhouse; 11,660	4–1
6	November 7	@ Chicago	L 83–100	Amar'e Stoudemire (26)	Robin Lopez, Amar'e Stoudemire (7)	Steve Nash (5)	United Center; 21,967	4–2
7	November 8	@ Milwaukee	W 104–96	Shaquille O'Neal (29)	Shaquille O'Neal, Grant Hill (11)	Steve Nash (7)	Bradley Center; 17,935	5–2
8	November 10	Memphis	W 107–102	Leandro Barbosa (27)	Matt Barnes (8)	Steve Nash (6)	US Airways Center; 18,422	6–2
9	November 12	Houston	L 82–94	Leandro Barbosa, Shaquille O'Neal (18)	Shaquille O'Neal (13)	Shaquille O'Neal, Steve Nash (3)	US Airways Center; 18,422	6–3
10	November 14	@ Sacramento	W 97–95 (OT)	Shaquille O'Neal (29)	Shaquille O'Neal (13)	Shaquille O'Neal (6)	ARCO Arena; 12,810	7–3
11	November 16	Detroit	W 104–86	Amar'e Stoudemire (29)	Amar'e Stoudemire (11)	Steve Nash (7)	US Airways Center; 18,422	8–3
12	November 17	@ Utah	L 97–109	Amar'e Stoudemire (30)	Amar'e Stoudemire (8)	Steve Nash (8)	EnergySolutions Arena; 19,911	8–4
13	November 20	L.A. Lakers	L 92–105	Amar'e Stoudemire (21)	Shaquille O'Neal (9)	Steve Nash (10)	US Airways Center; 18,422	8–5
14	November 22	Portland	W 102–92	Shaquille O'Neal (19)	Shaquille O'Neal (17)	Steve Nash (7)	US Airways Center; 18,422	9–5
15	November 25	@ Oklahoma City	W 99–98	Amar'e Stoudemire (22)	Steve Nash (8)	Steve Nash (15)	Ford Center; 19,136	10–5
16	November 26	@ Minnesota	W 110–102	Steve Nash (20)	Shaquille O'Neal (10)	Steve Nash (6)	Target Center; 11,708	11–5
17	November 28	Miami	L 92–107	Leandro Barbosa (20)	Shaquille O'Neal (9)	Leandro Barbosa (5)	US Airways Center; 18,422	11–6
18	November 30	New Jersey	L 109–117	Steve Nash (26)	Amar'e Stoudemire (12)	Steve Nash (9)	US Airways Center; 18,422	11–7

December: 7–5 (home: 5–1; road: 2–4)

Game	Date	Team	Score	High points	High rebounds	High assists	Location Attendance	Record
19	December 3	@ New Orleans	L 91–104	Amar'e Stoudemire (26)	Matt Barnes (7)	Grant Hill (6)	New Orleans Arena; 15,804	11–8
20	December 4	@ Dallas	L 97–112	Amar'e Stoudemire (28)	Matt Barnes (6)	Steve Nash (10)	American Airlines Center; 19,813	11–9
21	December 6	Utah	W 106–104	Leandro Barbosa (25)	Amar'e Stoudemire (20)	Steve Nash (9)	US Airways Center; 18,422	12–9
22	December 9	Milwaukee	W 125–110	Shaquille O'Neal (35)	Shaquille O'Neal, Amar'e Stoudemire (8)	Steve Nash (10)	US Airways Center; 18,422	13–9
23	December 10	@ L.A. Lakers	L 110–115	Matt Barnes (25)	Amar'e Stoudemire (11)	Steve Nash (9)	Staples Center; 18,997	13–10
24	December 12	Orlando	W 113–112	Jason Richardson, Amar'e Stoudemire, Steve Nash (21)	Amar'e Stoudemire (14)	Steve Nash (10)	US Airways Center; 18,422	14–10
25	December 15	New York	W 111–103	Shaquille O'Neal (23)	Amar'e Stoudemire (14)	Steve Nash (6)	US Airways Center; 18,422	15–10
26	December 18	@ Portland	L 119–124	Amar'e Stoudemire (23)	Amar'e Stoudemire (8)	Steve Nash (11)	Rose Garden; 20,650	15–11
27	December 20	Denver	W 108–101	Amar'e Stoudemire (27)	Amar'e Stoudemire (10)	Steve Nash (11)	US Airways Center; 18,422	16–11
28	December 25	San Antonio	L 90–91	Amar'e Stoudemire (25)	Amar'e Stoudemire (13)	Steve Nash (8)	US Airways Center; 18,422	16–12
29	December 29	@ Oklahoma City	W 110–102	Shaquille O'Neal (28)	Shaquille O'Neal (12)	Leandro Barbosa, Amar'e Stoudemire (5)	Ford Center; 19,136	17–12
30	December 30	@ Memphis	W 101–89	Leandro Barbosa (28)	Shaquille O'Neal (13)	Matt Barnes (5)	FedExForum; 14,471	18–12

January: 7–8 (home: 3–4; road: 4–4)

Game	Date	Team	Score	High points	High rebounds	High assists	Location Attendance	Record
31	January 2	L.A. Clippers	W 106–98	Amar'e Stoudemire (23)	Shaquille O'Neal (9)	Steve Nash (11)	US Airways Center; 18,422	19–12
32	January 7	Indiana	L 110–113	Amar'e Stoudemire (23)	Louis Amundson (14)	Steve Nash (12)	US Airways Center; 18,422	19–13
33	January 9	Dallas	W 128–100	Shaquille O'Neal (25)	Shaquille O'Neal (10)	Steve Nash (12)	US Airways Center; 18,422	20–13
34	January 11	@ L.A. Clippers	W 109–103	Amar'e Stoudemire (26)	Shaquille O'Neal (10)	Steve Nash (12)	Staples Center; 17,307	21–13
35	January 13	Atlanta	W 107–102	Shaquille O'Neal (26)	Matt Barnes, Shaquille O'Neal (10)	Steve Nash (6)	US Airways Center; 18,422	22–13
36	January 15	@ Denver	L 113–119 (OT)	Grant Hill (25)	Grant Hill, Amar'e Stoudemire (8)	Steve Nash (14)	Pepsi Center; 18,073	22–14
37	January 16	Minnesota	L 103–105	Shaquille O'Neal, Leandro Barbosa (22)	Shaquille O'Neal (11)	Steve Nash (6)	US Airways Center; 18,422	22–15
38	January 18	@ Toronto	W 117–113	Amar'e Stoudemire (31)	Grant Hill (9)	Steve Nash (18)	Air Canada Centre; 19,800	23–15
39	January 19	@ Boston	L 87–104	Shaquille O'Neal (16)	Shaquille O'Neal (11)	Steve Nash (8)	TD Banknorth Garden; 18,624	23–16
40	January 21	@ New York	L 109–114	Jason Richardson (27)	Shaquille O'Neal (12)	Steve Nash (19)	Madison Square Garden; 19,256	23–17
41	January 23	@ Charlotte	L 76–98	Shaquille O'Neal (20)	Amar'e Stoudemire (9)	Steve Nash (5)	Time Warner Cable Arena; 19,104	23–18
42	January 25	@ Atlanta	W 104–99	Amar'e Stoudemire (23)	Shaquille O'Neal (11)	Steve Nash (13)	Philips Arena; 19,153	24–18
43	January 26	@ Washington	W 103–87	Shaquille O'Neal (29)	Amar'e Stoudemire (15)	Steve Nash (15)	Verizon Center; 17,344	25–18
44	January 29	San Antonio	L 104–114	Amar'e Stoudemire (28)	Amar'e Stoudemire, Grant Hill (10)	Steve Nash (18)	US Airways Center; 18,422	25–19
45	January 31	Chicago	L 111–122	Leandro Barbosa (32)	Shaquille O'Neal (8)	Steve Nash (10)	US Airways Center; 18,422	25–20

February: 8–5 (home: 6–1; road: 2–4)

Game	Date	Team	Score	High points	High rebounds	High assists	Location Attendance	Record
46	February 2	Sacramento	W 129–81	Amar'e Stoudemire (25)	Shaquille O'Neal (9)	Steve Nash (9)	US Airways Center; 18,422	26–20
47	February 4	@ Golden State	L 112–124	Jason Richardson (24)	Shaquille O'Neal (12)	Steve Nash (9)	Oracle Arena; 19,596	26–21
48	February 6	Golden State	W 115–105	Grant Hill (27)	Amar'e Stoudemire (15)	Steve Nash (8)	US Airways Center; 18,422	27–21
49	February 8	@ Detroit	W 107–97	Jason Richardson (21)	Shaquille O'Neal (10)	Steve Nash (21)	The Palace of Auburn Hills; 22,076	28–21
50	February 9	@ Philadelphia	L 91–108	Amar'e Stoudemire (19)	Shaquille O'Neal (10)	Steve Nash (8)	Wachovia Center; 16,797	28–22
51	February 11	@ Cleveland	L 92–109	Amar'e Stoudemire (27)	Amar'e Stoudemire, Shaquille O'Neal, Matt Barnes (6)	Leandro Barbosa (7)	Quicken Loans Arena; 20,562	28–23
52	February 17	L.A. Clippers	W 140–100	Leandro Barbosa (24)	Matt Barnes (9)	Steve Nash (10)	US Airways Center; 18,422	29–23
53	February 18	@ L.A. Clippers	W 142–119	Amar'e Stoudemire (42)	Amar'e Stoudemire (11)	Steve Nash (12)	Staples Center; 18,169	30–23
54	February 20	Oklahoma City	W 140–118	Leandro Barbosa (41)	Shaquille O'Neal (9)	Matt Barnes (9)	US Airways Center; 18,422	31–23
55	February 22	Boston	L 108–128	Jason Richardson (21)	Shaquille O'Neal (6)	Steve Nash (11)	US Airways Center; 18,422	31–24
56	February 24	Charlotte	W 112–102	Steve Nash (22)	Shaquille O'Neal (11)	Steve Nash (5)	US Airways Center; 18,422	32–24
57	February 26	@ L.A. Lakers	L 106–132	Leandro Barbosa (18)	Jared Dudley (8)	Leandro Barbosa (7)	Staples Center; 18,997	32–25
58	February 27	Toronto	W 133–113	Shaquille O'Neal (45)	Shaquille O'Neal (11)	Grant Hill (12)	US Airways Center; 18,422	33–25

March: 7–9 (home: 6–2; road: 1–7)

Game	Date	Team	Score	High points	High rebounds	High assists	Location Attendance	Record
59	March 1	L.A. Lakers	W 118–111	Shaquille O'Neal (33)	Matt Barnes (10)	Matt Barnes, Leandro Barbosa (7)	US Airways Center; 18,422	34–25
60	March 3	@ Orlando	L 99–111	Jason Richardson (27)	Shaquille O'Neal (11)	Steve Nash (8)	Amway Arena; 17,461	34–26
61	March 4	@ Miami	L 129–135	Steve Nash (29)	Shaquille O'Neal (8)	Steve Nash (10)	American Airlines Arena; 19,600	34–27
62	March 6	@ Houston	L 112–116	Steve Nash (32)	Matt Barnes (9)	Steve Nash (13)	Toyota Center; 18,045	34–28
63	March 8	@ San Antonio	L 98–103	Steve Nash (23)	Grant Hill (8)	Steve Nash (11)	AT&T Center; 18,797	34–29
64	March 10	Dallas	L 117–122	Steve Nash (23)	Louis Amundson (9)	Steve Nash (13)	US Airways Center; 18,422	34–30
65	March 12	Cleveland	L 111–119	Matt Barnes (21)	Jason Richardson, Shaquille O'Neal (7)	Steve Nash (6)	US Airways Center; 18,422	34–31
66	March 14	Oklahoma City	W 106–95	Leandro Barbosa (22)	Jared Dudley (9)	Steve Nash (8)	US Airways Center; 18,422	35–31
67	March 15	@ Golden State	W 154–130	Jason Richardson (31)	Grant Hill (8)	Matt Barnes (11)	Oracle Arena; 19,596	36–31
68	March 18	Philadelphia	W 126–116	Shaquille O'Neal (26)	Shaquille O'Neal (11)	Steve Nash (10)	US Airways Center; 18,422	37–31
69	March 21	Washington	W 128–96	Jason Richardson (35)	Stromile Swift (12)	Jared Dudley (6)	US Airways Center; 18,422	38–31
70	March 23	Denver	W 118–115	Grant Hill (23)	Grant Hill (10)	Steve Nash (9)	US Airways Center; 18,422	39–31
71	March 25	Utah	W 118–114	Grant Hill (26)	Shaquille O'Neal (12)	Steve Nash (14)	US Airways Center; 18,422	40–31
72	March 26	@ Portland	L 109–129	Shaquille O'Neal (20)	Shaquille O'Neal (7)	Steve Nash (5)	Rose Garden; 20,650	40–32
73	March 28	@ Utah	L 99–104 (OT)	Steve Nash (20)	Shaquille O'Neal, Matt Barnes (10)	Steve Nash (6)	EnergySolutions Arena; 19,911	40–33
74	March 29	@ Sacramento	L 118–126	Steve Nash (31)	Jared Dudley (11)	Steve Nash (14)	ARCO Arena; 13,623	40–34

April: 5–2 (home: 3–0; road: 2–2)

Game	Date	Team	Score	High points	High rebounds	High assists	Location Attendance	Record
75	April 1	Houston	W 114–109	Steve Nash (25)	Shaquille O'Neal (10)	Steve Nash (17)	US Airways Center; 18,422	41–34
76	April 3	Sacramento	W 139–111	Steve Nash (29)	Matt Barnes (11)	Steve Nash (9)	US Airways Center; 18,422	42–34
77	April 5	@ Dallas	L 116–140	Leandro Barbosa (24)	Shaquille O'Neal (7)	Steve Nash (8)	American Airlines Center; 20,301	42–35
78	April 8	@ New Orleans	W 105–100	Steve Nash (24)	Shaquille O'Neal (11)	Steve Nash (13)	New Orleans Arena; 17,781	43–35
79	April 10	@ Memphis	L 89–106	Louis Amundson, Jason Richardson (13)	Louis Amundson (9)	Goran Dragić (7)	FedExForum; 15,908	43–36
80	April 11	@ Minnesota	W 110–97	Grant Hill (19)	Robin Lopez (11)	Goran Dragić (8)	Target Center; 18,478	44–36
81	April 13	Memphis	W 119–110	Shaquille O'Neal (19)	Jason Richardson, Grant Hill (8)	Steve Nash (12)	US Airways Center; 18,422	45–36
82	April 15	Golden State	W 117–113	Grant Hill (27)	Grant Hill (10)	Steve Nash (12)	US Airways Center; 18,422	46–36

2015–16 season schedule

== Player statistics ==
Legend
GP	Games played	GS	Games started	MPG	Minutes per game
FG%	Field-goal percentage	3P%	3-point field-goal percentage	FT%	Free-throw percentage
RPG	Rebounds per game	APG	Assists per game	SPG	Steals per game
BPG	Blocks per game	PPG	Points per game

=== Season ===
Player	GP	GS	MPG	FG%	3P%	FT%	RPG	APG	SPG	BPG	PPG
Louis Amundson	76	0	13.7	.536	.000	.442	3.6	0.4	.4	.9	4.2
Leandro Barbosa	70	11	24.4	.482	.375	.881	2.6	2.3	1.2	.1	14.2
Matt Barnes	77	40	27.0	.423	.343	.743	5.5	2.8	.7	.3	10.2
Raja Bell*	22	22	32.4	.429	.468^	.762	2.9	1.3	.6	.1	9.6
Dee Brown*	2	0	14.0	.200	.250	1.000#	0.5	1.5	.0	.0	2.5
Boris Diaw*	22	0	24.5	.567	.357	.692	3.8	2.1	.5	.4	8.3
Goran Dragic	55	1	13.2	.393	.370	.769	1.9	2.0	.5	.1	4.5
Jared Dudley*	48	0	15.2	.481	.394	.691	3.0	0.8	.8	.1	5.5
Grant Hill	82	68	29.8	.523	.316	.808	4.9	2.3	1.1	.7	12.0
Robin Lopez	60	7	10.2	.518	.000	.691	2.0	0.1	.2	.7	3.2
Steve Nash	74	74	33.6+	.503	.439^	.933#	3.0	9.7	.7	.1	15.7
Shaquille O'Neal	75	75	30.0	.609	.000	.595	8.4	1.7	.7	1.4	17.8+
Jason Richardson*	58	57	33.1	.488	.383	.778	4.5	1.9	1.1	.4	16.4
Courtney Sims*	1	0	2.0	.	.	.	0.0	0.0	.0	.0	2.0
Sean Singletary*	13	1	9.4	.324	.400	1.000#	1.2	0.9	.5	.0	2.6
Amar'e Stoudemire	53	53	36.8+	.539	.429	.835	8.1	2.0	.9	1.1	21.4+
Stromile Swift*	13	0	9.3	.366	1.000^	.533	2.5	0.2	.3	.5	3.0
Alando Tucker	30	1	9.4	.430	.348	.788	1.0	0.4	.2	.0	4.6

* – Stats with the Suns.
+ – Minimum 70 games played or 2000 minutes, 1400 points.
^ – Minimum 55 three-pointers made.
# – Minimum 125 free throws made.

== Awards and records ==
=== Awards ===
- O'Neal was named to the All-NBA Third Team.

==== Week/Month ====
- Stoudemire was named the NBA Western Conference Player of the Week for Nov. 3–9.
- Stoudemire has been named the recipient of the NBA Community Assist Award for October.

==== All-Star ====
- Stoudemire was voted to his 4th NBA All-Star Game as a starter.
- O'Neal was named to his 15th career NBA All-Star Game in 17 seasons.
- O'Neal was named the 2009 NBA All-Star MVP with former teammate Kobe Bryant.

== Transactions ==
=== Trades ===
June 26, 2008	To Phoenix Suns Draft rights to Goran Dragić	To San Antonio Spurs Draft rights to Malik Hairston 2009 second-round pick cash considerations
August 25, 2008	To Phoenix Suns Sean Singletary	To Houston Rockets D. J. Strawberry
December 10, 2008	To Phoenix Suns Jason Richardson Jared Dudley 2010 second-round pick	To Charlotte Bobcats Raja Bell Boris Diaw Sean Singletary

=== Free agents ===
==== Additions ====
Player	Signed	Former team
Matt Barnes	July 22	Golden State Warriors
Louis Amundson	August 14	Philadelphia 76ers
Dee Brown	December 24	Washington Wizards

==== Subtractions ====
Player	Left	New team
Eric Piatkowski	July 1	free agent
Brian Skinner	July 31	Los Angeles Clippers
Gordan Giriček	August 19	Fenerbahçe Ülker
Sean Marks	August 28	New Orleans Hornets
Linton Johnson	October 28	Charlotte Bobcats
Dee Brown	January 6	free agent

== See also ==
- 2008–09 NBA season
