= Sean Singletary =

American basketball player (born 1985)

Personal information
- Born: September 6, 1985 (age 41) Philadelphia, Pennsylvania, U.S.
- Listed height: 6 ft 0 in (1.83 m)
- Listed weight: 185 lb (84 kg)

Career information
- High school: William Penn Charter School (Philadelphia, Pennsylvania)
- College: Virginia (2004–2008)
- NBA draft: 2008: 2nd round, 42nd overall pick
- Drafted by: Sacramento Kings
- Playing career: 2008–2014
- Position: Point guard
- Number: 14, 44

Career history
- 2008: Phoenix Suns
- 2008–2009: Charlotte Bobcats
- 2009: →Sioux Falls Skyforce
- 2009–2010: Caja Laboral
- 2011–2012: Belfius Mons-Hainaut
- 2012–2013: Texas Legends
- 2013: Telenet Oostende
- 2013–2014: Texas Legends
- 2014: Erie BayHawks

Career highlights
- Third-team All-American – NABC (2007); AP honorable mention All-American (2008); 3× First-team All-ACC (2006–2008); ACC All-Freshmen Team (2005); No. 44 jersey retired by Virginia Cavaliers
- Stats at NBA.com
- Stats at Basketball Reference

Sean Michael-Eli Singletary (born September 6, 1985) is an American former professional basketball player who played in the National Basketball Association (NBA) and other professional leagues. He played college basketball for the Virginia Cavaliers, who retired his jersey.

== Early life ==
Singletary was born in Philadelphia, Pennsylvania. He attended C. W. Henry Elementary School in Mount Airy, Philadelphia, attended The Haverford School and then The Perkiomen School for his freshman and sophomore years of high school, then attended high school at William Penn Charter School in Philadelphia for his junior and senior years. He was also a football player in high school, excelling at wide receiver, but he gave up the sport to focus on basketball.

Considered a four-star recruit by Rivals.com, Singletary was listed as the No. 10 point guard and the No. 56 player in the nation in 2004.

== College career ==
Singletary improved upon his All-ACC Freshman performance in 2004–05 by averaging 17.7 points per game and earning all-ACC first team honors during his sophomore season, which included his second highest scoring game, a 35-point effort against an Adam Morrison-led Gonzaga team.

Singletary was Virginia's floor leader during their pivotal 2006–07 season in which the team moved from their old home at University Hall across the street to the 130 million dollar John Paul Jones Arena. Virginia enjoyed perhaps its best season since 1994–95 with Singletary and senior J. R. Reynolds.

On March 9, 2008, against the University of Maryland, Singletary scored his 2,000th career point and finished the game with 2,002 points, and finished his career as the fifth-highest all-time scorer in school history with 2,079 points. He also joined greats Greivis Vasquéz, Johnny Dawkins, and Danny Ferry as the only four players in ACC history to record 2,000 career points, 500 career assists, and 400 career rebounds; adding his 200 career steals makes him the only ACC player to ever record each of those four milestones. Singletary was selected to the 2007–08 All-ACC team, making him, Bryant Stith, and Ralph Sampson the only three Cavaliers to be named all-conference three times in their careers.

Singletary's number 44 was retired by the University of Virginia at halftime of a game against Clemson on February 15, 2009.

As a freshman, he was the only player on the team to start every game during the 2004–2005 season, and was selected to the All-Atlantic Coast Conference Freshman Team. He averaged 10.5 points per game, as well as 3.9 assists per contest in his rookie campaign. Singletary ranked first among ACC freshmen in assists and steals, second in minutes played and third in scoring. He was selected to the CollegeInsider.com Freshmen All-America Team and a second-team selection to the Rivals.com Freshmen All-America Team.

In his sophomore year, Singletary earned a first team All-Atlantic Coast Conference selection (the first from UVA since Bryant Stith in '92) by averaging 17.7 points (1st team, 5th ACC), and ranking third in FT% in the ACC (.845 125–148), fifth in steals (1.86 54), and sixth in assists (4.17 apg. 121). Against Gonzaga on December 17, 2005, he scored a career-high 35 points, including four 3-pointers, and had six steals and six rebounds in an 11-point loss, and was named ACC Player of The Week. His first career double-double (29 pts, 10 reb) came in the ACC Tournament against the University of North Carolina on March 10, 2006. Singletary was also a co-captain of the Cavaliers and was also named First-team All-ACC selection by SI.com, State Player of the Year and a first-team All-State selection by the VaSID, Player of the Year in Virginia and first-team All-State as selected by the Richmond Times-Dispatch, co-recipient of the Bill Gibson Cavalier of the Year Award (team MVP), co-recipient of the Sidney Young Memorial Trophy (team award to that athlete who exemplifies the highest qualities of leadership, cooperative spirit and unselfish service in the interest of athletics at the University of Virginia), and received the team's Most Assists Award.

Singletary became one of the elite point guards in the country his junior year, scoring in double digits in all but one game. He finished the season first on his team and third in the ACC in scoring with 19.0 points per game. Although Virginia started the season slowly, Singletary was instrumental in a seven game in-conference win streak that helped Virginia win a share of the ACC regular season title with an 11–5 record. On January 3, 2007, he scored a career-high 37 points in a blowout of Gonzaga. Singletary gained national attention when he hit an acrobatic game-winning shot against Duke on February 1, 2007, with 1.0 seconds left on the clock, giving Virginia a win over Duke 68–66. On March 6, 2007, Singletary was named to the first team All-Atlantic Coast Conference team for the second consecutive season and was named as a third team All-American by the National Association of Basketball coaches. Along with backcourt mate J.R. Reynolds, he led UVA to its first NCAA tournament berth since 2001, where they played the University of Albany in the first round. Singletary scored 23 points and had 9 assists in a 27-point win over UAlbany. In the second round, Singletary scored 19 points, but only shot 29% from the floor and missed the potential game tying shot in a 77–74 loss to Tennessee. After his missed shot, Singletary fell to the ground crying. Seconds later his coach and teammates approached him to offer consolation.

Singletary confirmed to head coach Dave Leitao that he would return for his senior year season just hours before the 5 p.m. draft withdrawal deadline.

For the 2007–08 season, Singletary was Virginia's primary offensive weapon. Singletary was a co-captain of the 2007–08 Cavaliers, along with Adrian Joseph. Singletary was among conference leaders in the ACC in several statistical categories. As of late February he was second in the ACC in assists, third in scoring, ninth in steals and third in free throw percentage. He had his highest scoring game on March 1, 2008, against Miami, when he scored 41 points. Singletary was selected to the 2007–2008 1st Team All ACC for the third consecutive year. His last collegiate basketball game was a loss against Bradley University at home, in the College Basketball Invitational Tournament. He scored 17 points in the game and received a standing ovation from his loyal fans for his legendary career as a Cavalier.

== Professional career ==
After undergoing offseason hip surgery, Sean Singletary was selected in the second round of the 2008 NBA draft with the 42nd pick by the Sacramento Kings. In August 2008 he was traded to the Houston Rockets along with Patrick Ewing Jr. and Ron Artest (now Metta World Peace) then subsequently traded to the Phoenix Suns in exchange for D. J. Strawberry. On December 10, 2008, he was traded once again along with Boris Diaw and Raja Bell to the Charlotte Bobcats for Jason Richardson and Jared Dudley. On March 9, 2009, the Charlotte Bobcats assigned Singletary along with Alexis Ajinça to the NBA D-League's Sioux Falls Skyforce.

Following the 2008–09 season, Bobcats didn't pick up the team option on Singletary, therefore he became a free agent. He signed with the Philadelphia 76ers in September 2009, but was waived in October of that year.

On November 10, 2009, he signed with the Spanish Liga ACB team Caja Laboral. Singletary played his last game with Caja Laboral on April 17, 2010. Caja Laboral later became the ACB champion.

In 2011–12, he played for the Belgian League team Dexia Mons-Hainaut.

On November 2, 2012, he was selected by the Texas Legends in the second round of the 2012 NBA D-League Draft. He was waived by the team on April 5, 2013, due to an injury. Later that month, he joined Telenet Oostende of Belgium for the rest of the 2012–13 season.

In November 2013, he was re-acquired by the Texas Legends. On January 22, 2014, he was traded to the Erie BayHawks. On March 26, 2014, he was waived by the BayHawks due to a season-ending injury. Singletary retired from basketball at the close of the 2013–14 season.

== Awards and accomplishments ==
- First Team All-ACC (2005–06, 2006–07, 2007–08)
- Freshman All-ACC (2004–05)
- Third Team All-American (2006–07)
- All-American Honorable Mention (2007–08)

== NBA career statistics ==
Legend
GP	Games played	GS	Games started	MPG	Minutes per game
FG%	Field goal percentage	3P%	3-point field goal percentage	FT%	Free throw percentage
RPG	Rebounds per game	APG	Assists per game	SPG	Steals per game
BPG	Blocks per game	PPG	Points per game	**Bold**	Career high

=== Regular season ===
Year	Team	GP	GS	MPG	FG%	3P%	FT%	RPG	APG	SPG	BPG	PPG
2008–09	Phoenix	13	**1**	**9.4**	.324	**.400**	**1.000**	**1.2**	**.9**	**.5**	.0	**2.6**
2008–09	Charlotte	**24**	**1**	7.5	**.396**	**.400**	.800	.8	.7	.2	.0	2.3
Career		37	2	8.2	.365	.400	.857	.9	.8	.3	.0	2.4
