= Jared Dudley =

American basketball player (born 1985)

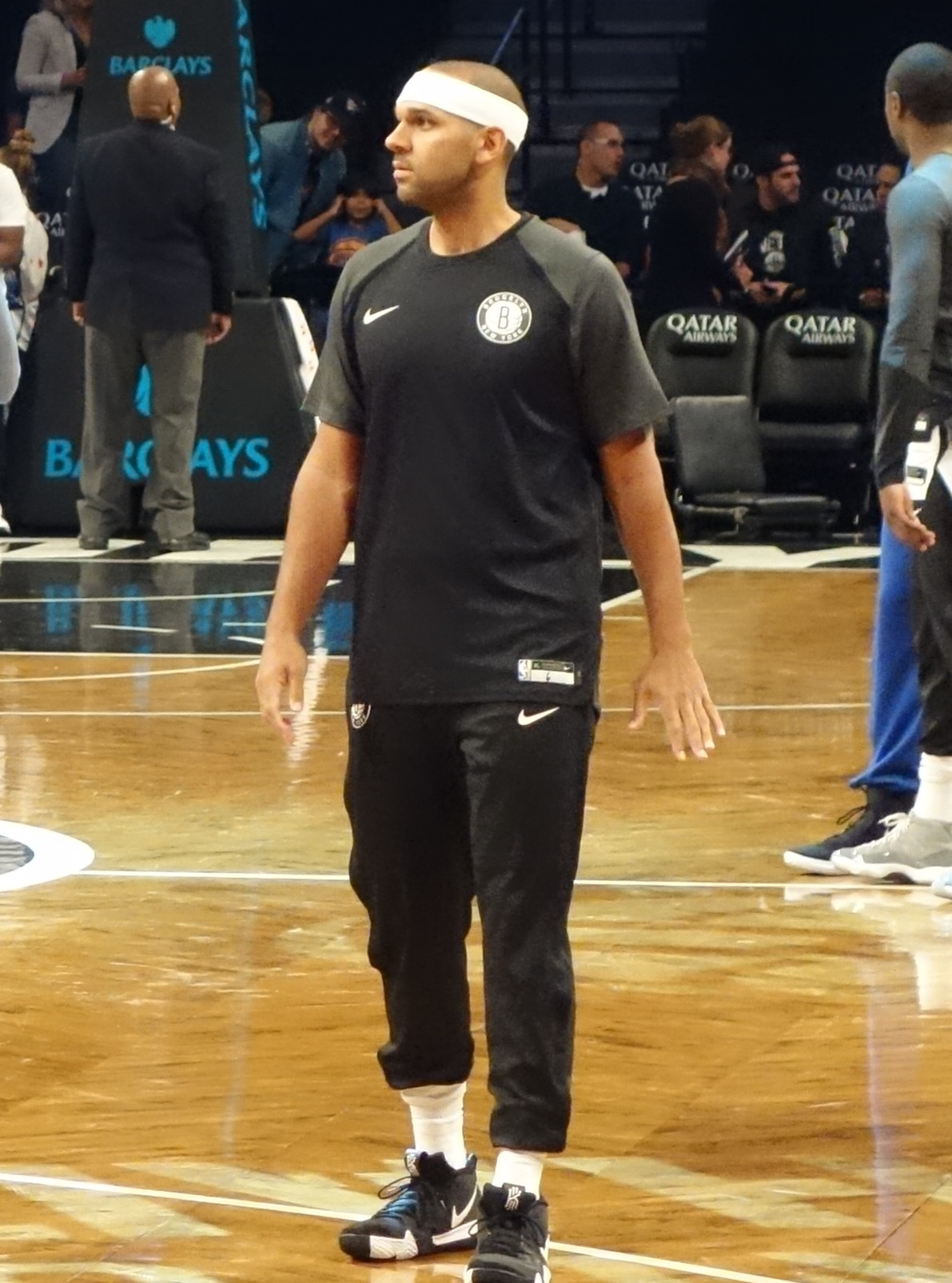
- Dudley with the Brooklyn Nets in 2018

Denver Nuggets
- Title: Assistant coach
- League: NBA

Personal information
- Born: July 10, 1985 (age 41) San Diego, California, U.S.
- Listed height: 6 ft 6 in (1.98 m)
- Listed weight: 237 lb (108 kg)

Career information
- High school: Horizon (San Diego, California)
- College: Boston College (2003–2007)
- NBA draft: 2007: 1st round, 22nd overall pick
- Drafted by: Charlotte Bobcats
- Playing career: 2007–2021
- Position: Small forward / power forward
- Number: 1, 3, 4, 6, 9, 10
- Coaching career: 2021–present

Career history

Playing
- 2007–2008: Charlotte Bobcats
- 2008–2013: Phoenix Suns
- 2013–2014: Los Angeles Clippers
- 2014–2015: Milwaukee Bucks
- 2015–2016: Washington Wizards
- 2016–2018: Phoenix Suns
- 2018–2019: Brooklyn Nets
- 2019–2021: Los Angeles Lakers

Coaching
- 2021–2025: Dallas Mavericks (assistant)
- 2025–present: Denver Nuggets (assistant)

Career highlights
- As player: NBA champion (2020); Consensus second-team All-American (2007); ACC Player of the Year (2007); First-team All-ACC (2007); Second-team All-ACC (2006); Big East co-Most Improved Player (2005); First-team All-Big East (2005); Big East All-Rookie Team (2004)

Career statistics
- Points: 6,633 (7.3 ppg)
- Rebounds: 2,849 (3.2 rpg)
- Assists: 1,394 (1.5 apg)
- Stats at NBA.com
- Stats at Basketball Reference

Jared Anthony Dudley (born July 10, 1985) is an American professional basketball coach and former player who is an assistant coach for the Denver Nuggets of the National Basketball Association (NBA). A forward, he played college basketball for the Boston College Eagles.

Dudley was selected with the 22nd overall pick in the 2007 NBA draft by the Charlotte Bobcats. After a season and a half in Charlotte, he was traded to the Phoenix Suns in December 2008. He would spend five seasons with the team before being dealt to the Los Angeles Clippers in July 2013. In August 2014, he was traded to the Milwaukee Bucks. In July 2015, Dudley was traded to the Washington Wizards. He made a return to Phoenix in July 2016 and spent another two years with the franchise before being traded to the Brooklyn Nets in July 2018. In July 2019, he signed a one-year deal with the Los Angeles Lakers. Dudley won an NBA championship with the Lakers in 2020. He re-signed with the Lakers in November 2020 before retiring in August 2021 and joining the Mavericks' coaching staff. In July 2025 he accepted an offer to become the top assistant coach for the Denver Nuggets.

== College career ==
During his college years, Dudley played with the Boston College Eagles. During the 2004–05 season, he earned the nickname "Junkyard Dog" for his toughness and nose for the ball.

He scored 30 points on November 29, 2006, against Michigan State on national television. His career-high in points is 36, which he scored against Villanova in a January 19, 2005 victory during his sophomore season. He averaged 19 points and 3 assists per game during his senior year.

After his senior season, Dudley was voted the ACC Player of the Year for 2007 and was a second team All-American.

== Professional career ==
=== Charlotte Bobcats (2007–2008) ===
On June 28, 2007, Dudley was taken 22nd overall in the NBA draft by the Charlotte Bobcats.

Soon after the 2007 draft, Dudley entered the Bobcats' regular playing rotation and made his first start on November 24, 2007, vs. Boston, scoring 11 points and grabbing nine rebounds. He went on to establish himself as a key player in the Bobcats' rotation, starting often while with the team. He finished the 2007–08 season averaging 5.8 points a game. He also played as the team's power forward during his rookie season with the Bobcats before being more of a small forward in his second season with them.

Dudley played 20 games for the Bobcats in 2008 before he was traded to the Phoenix Suns. In those 20 games, he averaged what would be a career low 5.4 points.

=== Phoenix Suns (2008–2013) ===
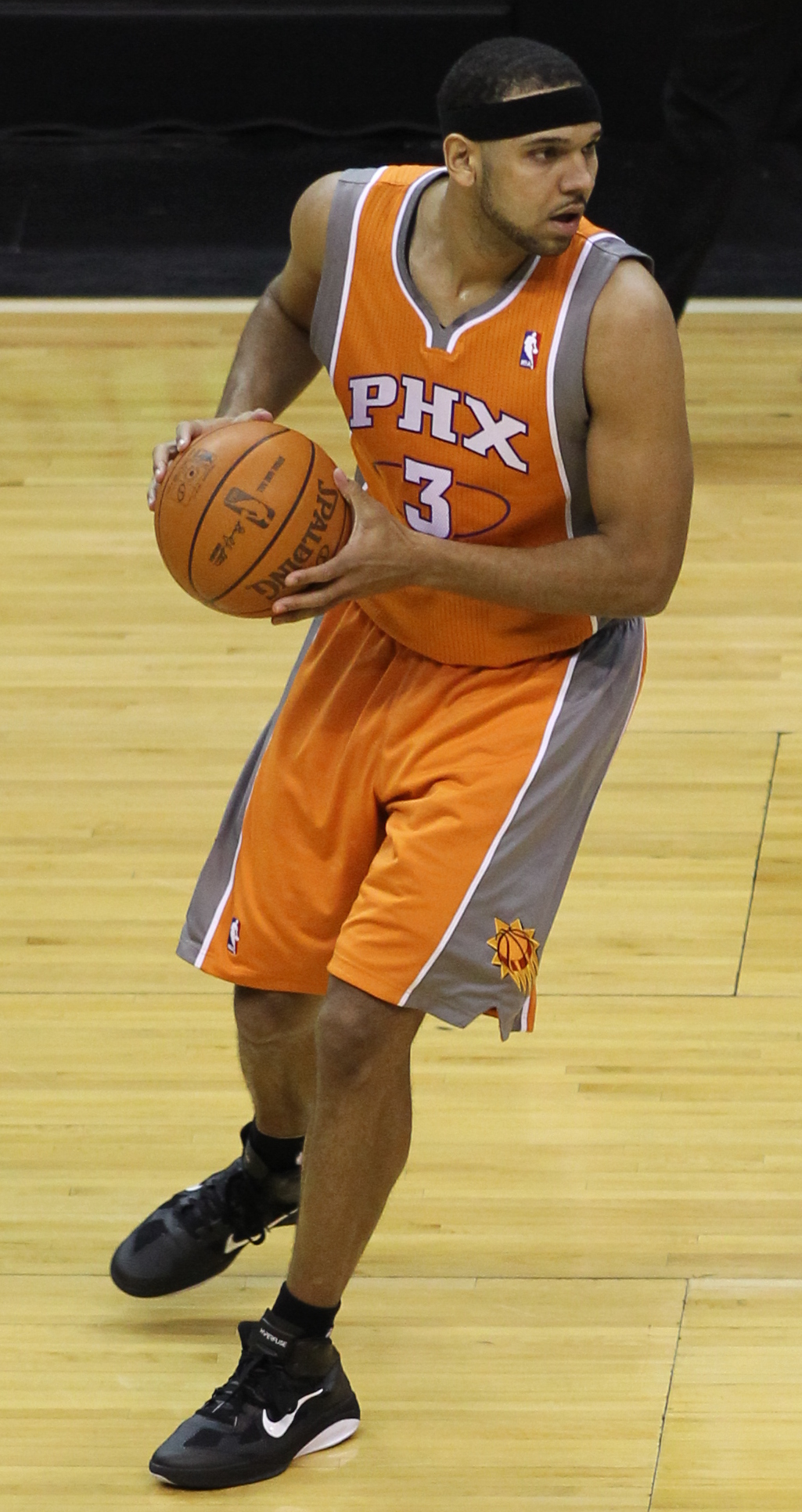
Dudley with the Suns in 2011

Dudley was traded to the Suns on December 18, 2008, along with teammate Jason Richardson and the Bobcats' 2010 second round pick, in exchange for Raja Bell, Boris Diaw, and Sean Singletary. He gained media attention for posting journalist-style videos of interviews with his Suns teammates on Twitter under the name of JMZ or JSPN (parodies of TMZ.com and ESPN respectively). Dudley played in 48 games for the Suns that season and averaged 3.0 rebounds per game, 0.8 assists a game, and 5.5 points per game.

In the 2009–10 season Dudley was a key player in the 2010 NBA Playoffs. He played in all of the Suns 16 playoff games that season, shooting 42.4% on three-pointers. But the Suns eventually lost to the Los Angeles Lakers in the Western Conference Finals by a margin of four games to two.

Although the Suns failed to reach the playoffs in the 2010–11 season, Dudley averaged a career-high 10.6 points per game. He once again played in all 82 games and started a career-high 15 of them.

In the shortened 2011–12 season, Dudley increased his career high with 12.7 points while also averaging a career-high 4.6 rebounds and career-high 1.7 assists per game while starting for the Suns in 60 of their games as a shooting guard instead of a small forward. However, the Suns missed the playoffs once again. After the 2011–12 NBA season, NBA TV announced that Dudley was the first ever winner of the "BIG Award", beating out the likes of James Harden and Kevin Love due to his use of social media websites like Twitter.

Due to the departure of veterans Steve Nash and Grant Hill, Dudley and Jermaine O'Neal were named the Suns' captains for the 2012–13 NBA season. On December 27, 2012, Dudley recorded a career-high 36 points on 11-of-17 shooting (5-of-8 from the three-point line and a perfect 9-of-9 from the free throw line), as well as five rebounds and three assists against the New York Knicks.

=== Los Angeles Clippers (2013–2014) ===
On July 10, 2013, Dudley was traded to the Los Angeles Clippers in a three-team deal that also included the Milwaukee Bucks getting draft picks and Phoenix Suns getting players in exchange, primarily Eric Bledsoe. Dudley was the Clippers' starting small forward until January 20, 2014, when he was replaced by Matt Barnes.

=== Milwaukee Bucks (2014–2015) ===
On August 26, 2014, Dudley was traded, along with a 2017 conditional first round draft pick, to the Milwaukee Bucks in exchange for Carlos Delfino, Miroslav Raduljica and a 2015 second round draft pick. He would play as the team's shooting guard that season due to Milwaukee's size at the frontcourt. On December 26, 2014, Dudley became the first player to shoot 100% from the field for an entire game with at least 10 overall shots and 3 three-point shots by making 10-of-10 field goals and 4-of-4 shots from the three-point line as he recorded 24 points, 4 rebounds, 4 steals and 2 assists off the bench in a blowout 107–77 victory over the Atlanta Hawks.

On June 30, 2015, Dudley opted in with the Bucks for the 2015–16 season.

=== Washington Wizards (2015–2016) ===
On July 9, 2015, Dudley was traded to the Washington Wizards in exchange for a protected future second round pick. On July 21, he was ruled out for three to four months after undergoing surgery to repair a herniated disk. Dudley spent much of the 2015–16 season as the team's power forward, due to the Wizards' lack of size at that position.

=== Return to Phoenix (2016–2018) ===
On July 8, 2016, Dudley signed with the Phoenix Suns, returning to the franchise for a second stint. While not his primary position, Dudley was made the Suns' power forward to start the 2016–17 season. He was moved to the bench after seven games, and on November 9, he scored a season-high 19 points off the bench in a 107–100 win over the Detroit Pistons. On March 24, 2017, he recorded a season-high 10 assists in a 130–120 loss to the Boston Celtics. On April 5, he scored a season high-tying 19 points in a 120–111 loss to the Golden State Warriors.

On June 23, 2017, Dudley underwent a left toe ligament and bone procedure, ruling him out for three to four months.

=== Brooklyn Nets (2018–2019) ===
On July 20, 2018, Dudley and a protected 2021 second round draft pick were traded to the Brooklyn Nets in exchange for Darrell Arthur. He missed 16 games over January and February of the 2018–19 season with a strained left hamstring. During Round 1 of the 2019 NBA Playoffs, he got into a feud with Philadelphia 76ers player Ben Simmons. He also got into an altercation with other 76ers players. Dudley was fined $25,000 for the incident.

=== Los Angeles Lakers (2019–2021) ===
On July 7, 2019, Dudley signed a one-year contract with the Los Angeles Lakers for $2.6 million. On August 13, 2020, he logged a season-high five assists in a 122–136 loss to the Sacramento Kings. On December 11, he was ejected from a game against the Orlando Magic after an on-court fight involving players from both teams. Teammate LeBron James later praised Dudley's actions, stating, "I've seen a lot more than that. But 'Dudz' will do whatever. He told you guys at media day his job is to come in here if somebody goes crazy, do something crazy to me or AD or whoever on the team, he's going to be the muscle." Dudley recorded a season-high nine points and three rebounds. Dudley won his only NBA championship as a player when the Lakers defeated the Miami Heat in six games in the 2020 NBA Finals.

On November 30, 2020, Dudley re-signed with the Lakers on another 1-year, $2.6 million contract. On December 27, he scored a season-high 3 points along with two rebounds in a 127–91 win over the Minnesota Timberwolves. He matched this total on February 24, 2021, along with four rebounds and an assist in an 89–114 blowout loss to the Utah Jazz. On March 3, Dudley grabbed a season-high two assists in a 120–123 loss to the Sacramento Kings. On March 14, the Lakers announced that Dudley had suffered a contusion and torn MCL in his right knee. However, he opted to not undergo surgery on his knee and instead underwent a period of rehab. He made his return from injury on May 16, 2021, after missing 33 games, playing four minutes in a 110–98 win over the New Orleans Pelicans.

At the conclusion of the 2020-21 season, Dudley announced his retirement from the NBA after 14 seasons.

== Coaching career ==
=== Dallas Mavericks (2021–2025) ===
On August 24, 2021, Dudley joined Jason Kidd's coaching staff with the Dallas Mavericks as an assistant coach. Dudley was expected to have a "front of the bench" role with the Mavericks.

=== Denver Nuggets (2025–present) ===
On July 3, 2025, Shams Charania reported that Dudley was joining the Denver Nuggets as their top assistant coach under David Adelman.

== Career statistics ==
Legend
GP	Games played	GS	Games started	MPG	Minutes per game
FG%	Field goal percentage	3P%	3-point field goal percentage	FT%	Free throw percentage
RPG	Rebounds per game	APG	Assists per game	SPG	Steals per game
BPG	Blocks per game	PPG	Points per game	**Bold**	Career high
†	Won an NBA championship	*	Led the league

=== NBA ===
==== Regular season ====
Year	Team	GP	GS	MPG	FG%	3P%	FT%	RPG	APG	SPG	BPG	PPG
2007–08	Charlotte	73	14	19.0	.468	.220	.737	3.9	1.1	.8	.1	5.8
2008–09	Charlotte	20	7	21.4	.469	.375	.625	3.0	1.0	.9	.1	5.4
2008–09	Phoenix	48	0	15.2	.481	.394	.691	3.0	.8	.8	.1	5.5
2009–10	Phoenix	**82***	1	24.3	.459	.458	.754	3.4	1.4	1.0	.2	8.2
2010–11	Phoenix	**82**	15	26.1	.477	.415	.743	3.9	1.3	**1.1**	.2	10.6
2011–12	Phoenix	65	**60**	**31.1**	**.485**	.383	.726	**4.6**	1.7	.8	**.3**	**12.7**
2012–13	Phoenix	79	50	27.5	.468	.391	.796	3.1	**2.6**	.9	.1	10.9
2013–14	L.A. Clippers	74	43	23.4	.438	.360	.655	2.2	1.4	.6	.1	6.9
2014–15	Milwaukee	72	22	23.8	.468	.385	.716	3.1	1.8	1.0	.2	7.2
2015–16	Washington	81	41	25.9	.478	.420	.735	3.5	2.1	.9	.2	7.9
2016–17	Phoenix	64	7	21.3	.454	.379	.662	3.5	1.9	.7	**.3**	6.8
2017–18	Phoenix	48	0	14.3	.393	.363	.771	2.0	1.6	.5	.2	3.2
2018–19	Brooklyn	59	25	20.7	.423	.351	.696	2.6	1.4	.6	**.3**	4.9
2019–20†	L.A. Lakers	45	1	8.1	.400	**.529**	**1.000**	1.2	.6	.3	.1	1.5
2020–21	L.A. Lakers	12	0	6.8	.222	.333	—	1.8	.4	.1	.1	.5
Career		904	286	22.3	.463	.393	.732	3.2	1.5	.8	.2	7.3

==== Playoffs ====
Year	Team	GP	GS	MPG	FG%	3P%	FT%	RPG	APG	SPG	BPG	PPG
2010	Phoenix	**16**	0	**23.6**	.465	.424	.607	**3.8**	1.8	1.1	**.4**	**7.6**
2014	L.A. Clippers	7	0	6.4	.273	.500	.000	.9	.3	.1	.0	1.3
2015	Milwaukee	6	0	18.3	**.467**	**.571**	.571	1.8	1.3	**2.0**	.3	6.7
2019	Brooklyn	4	**2**	20.5	.273	.222	**1.000**	.5	**2.8**	.8	.3	3.0
2020†	L.A. Lakers	9	0	3.4	.000	.000	.000	.2	.0	.4	.1	.0
2021	L.A. Lakers	2	0	2.5	—	—	—	.0	.0	.0	.0	.0
Career		44	2	14.8	.423	.418	.641	1.8	1.1	.9	.2	4.2

=== College ===
Year	Team	GP	GS	MPG	FG%	3P%	FT%	RPG	APG	SPG	BPG	PPG
2003–04	Boston College	34	34	34.0	.465	.316	.723	6.6	2.8	1.3	.2	11.9
2004–05	Boston College	30	30	36.0	.488	.333	**.754**	7.5	**3.2**	**1.6**	.2	16.5
2005–06	Boston College	**36**	**36**	37.2	.494	.351	.710	6.6	**3.2**	1.1	**.3**	16.7
2006–07	Boston College	30	30	**38.4**	**.562**	**.443**	.743	**8.3**	3.0	1.4	**.3**	**19.0**
Career		130	130	36.4	.504	.365	.731	7.2	3.0	1.4	.3	15.9

== Personal life ==
Dudley is a Christian. He appeared in the comedy film Movie 43 (2013), as a basketball player named Moses. Fellow NBA players Corey Brewer and Larry Sanders also appeared in the film. On February 2, 2021, Dudley and Carvell Wallace released a short, mostly autobiographical e-book called Inside the NBA Bubble: A Championship Season under Quarantine on Amazon. His book talked about his personal experience, feelings, and the settings for the Lakers' 17th NBA Finals won inside the 2020 NBA Bubble at Walt Disney World's ESPN Wide World of Sports Complex.

== Publications ==
- Dudley, Jared; Wallace, Carvell (2021). Inside the NBA Bubble: A Championship Season under Quarantine. Amazon Original Stories. ASIN B08T5SKBRW.
