= Jermareo Davidson =

American basketball player (born 1984)

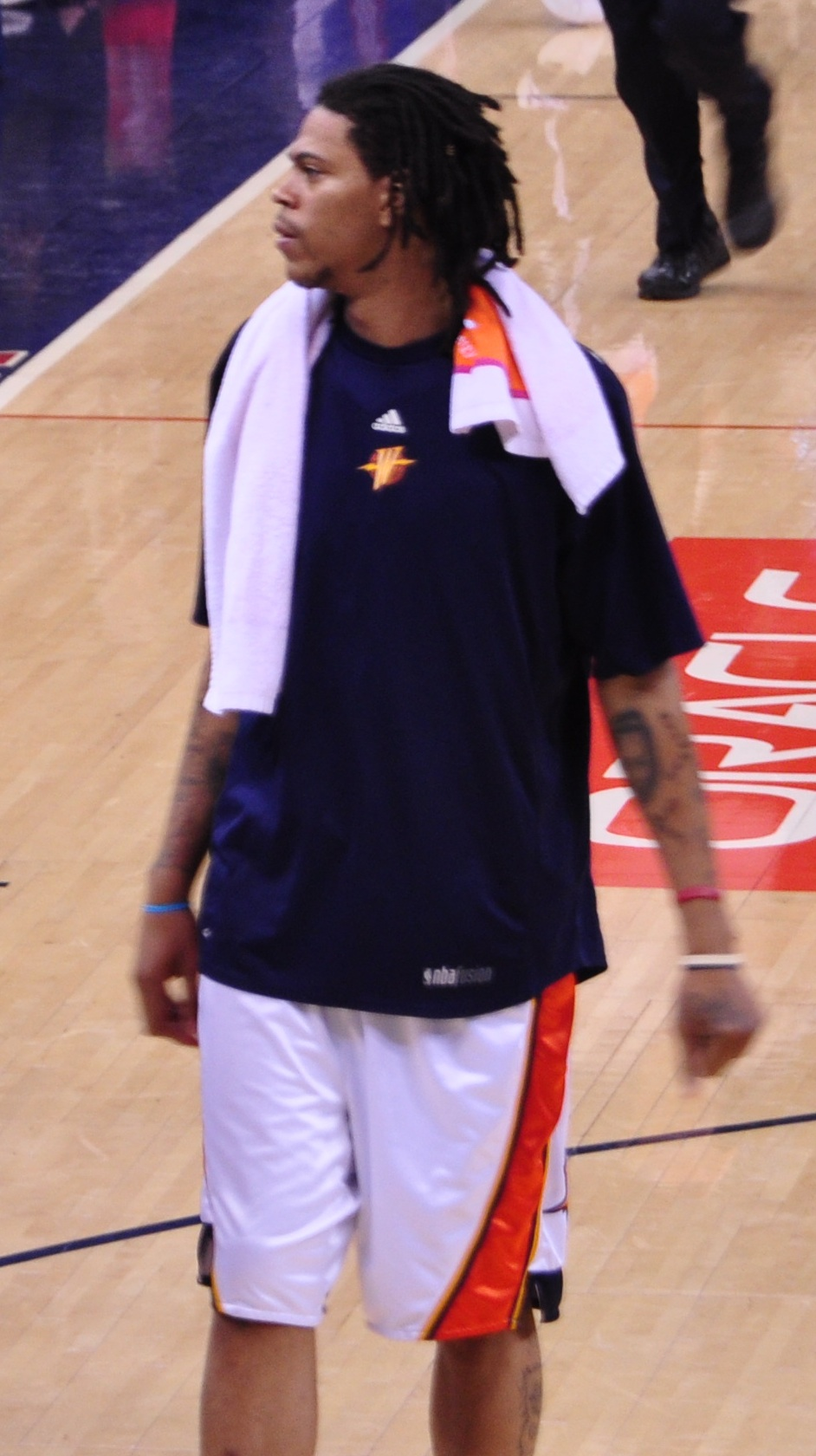
- Davidson with the Golden State Warriors in 2009

Personal information
- Born: November 15, 1984 (age 41) Atlanta, Georgia, U.S.
- Listed height: 6 ft 10 in (2.08 m)
- Listed weight: 230 lb (104 kg)

Career information
- High school: Joseph Wheeler (Marietta, Georgia)
- College: Alabama (2003–2007)
- NBA draft: 2007: 2nd round, 36th overall pick
- Drafted by: Golden State Warriors
- Playing career: 2007–2017
- Position: Power forward / center
- Number: 33

Career history
- 2007–2008: Charlotte Bobcats
- 2008: Sioux Falls Skyforce
- 2008–2009: Idaho Stampede
- 2009: Golden State Warriors
- 2009–2010: Darüşşafaka Cooper Tires
- 2010: Caciques de Humacao
- 2010: Krasnye Krylya Samara
- 2011: Idaho Stampede
- 2011–2012: Skyliners Frankfurt
- 2012–2013: Antalya BSB
- 2013–2014: Al Rayyan
- 2015: Al-Ittihad Jeddah

Career highlights
- First-team All-SEC (2006); Second-team All-SEC (2007)
- Stats at NBA.com
- Stats at Basketball Reference

Jermareo Birsute Dorsey Davidson (born November 15, 1984) is an American former professional basketball player. He played college basketball for the University of Alabama.

== High school ==
Jermareo Davidson attended Wheeler High School in Marietta, Georgia.

== College ==
Davidson attended The University of Alabama from 2003 to 2007.

== Professional ==
Davidson was named to the NBA 2007 Summer League All-Pro Second Team along with teammate Jared Dudley.

On July 26, 2007, Davidson was signed to a two-year deal by the Charlotte Bobcats. On October 27, 2008, he was released by the Bobcats.

On January 5, 2009, he was signed to a 10-day contract with the Golden State Warriors. Prior to the signing, Davidson was with the NBA Development League's Idaho Stampede, with whom he was averaging 16.1 points and 10.8 rebounds in 15 games. On January 15, he was signed to a second 10-day contract, and on January 25, he was signed for the rest of the season. On June 30, the Warriors announced that he would play for their 2009 NBA Summer League team in Las Vegas. After putting up disappointing numbers in the Summer League, the Warriors waived Davidson on July 27, 2009.

Davidson signed a contract with the Turkish Basketball League team Darüşşafaka Cooper Tires on October 1, 2009, and lead the Turkish league in rebounding that season, averaging 15.9 points and 10.7 rebounds.

On May 16, 2010, he signed a contract in Puerto Rico with Caciques de Humacao from the Baloncesto Superior Nacional (BSN) league.

In August 2011, Davidson signed a one-year deal with German club Skyliners Frankfurt.

On December 6, 2012, Davidson signed with Antalya Büyükşehir Belediyesi of Turkey. On February 27, 2013, he parted ways with Antalya.

On November 3, 2014, Davidson signed with Al-Ittihad Jeddah of Saudi Arabia.

== Awards ==
- 2006 AP All-SEC Second Team

== Career statistics ==
Legend
GP	Games played	GS	Games started	MPG	Minutes per game
FG%	Field goal percentage	3P%	3-point field goal percentage	FT%	Free throw percentage
RPG	Rebounds per game	APG	Assists per game	SPG	Steals per game
BPG	Blocks per game	PPG	Points per game	**Bold**	Career high

=== NBA seasons ===
Year	Team	GP	GS	MPG	FG%	3P%	FT%	RPG	APG	SPG	BPG	PPG
2007–08	Charlotte	**38**	**2**	**8.5**	.408	.000	**.643**	1.6	**.3**	**.2**	**.4**	**3.2**
2008–09	Golden State	14	0	7.9	**.486**	.000	.471	**2.4**	.1	.1	.2	3.0
Career		52	2	8.3	.425	.000	.578	1.8	.3	.2	.3	3.1

=== Domestic leagues ===
Season	Team	League	GP	MPG	FG%	3P%	FT%	RPG	APG	SPG	BPG	PPG
2007–08	Sioux Falls Skyforce	D-League	6	31.5	.489	.000	.733	9.8	.8	1.3	1.0	18.0
2008–09	Idaho Stampede	D-League	15	33.6	.519	–	.781	10.8	1.9	.7	1.5	16.1
2009–10	Darüşşafaka Cooper Tires	TBL	27	30.3	.497	.364	.628	10.7	.9	1.0	1.3	15.9
2010	Caciques de Humacao	BSN	2	10.0	.538	–	.500	2.0	.0	.0	.0	7.5
2010–11	Krasne Krylya Samara	PBL	7	14.1	.387	.000	.800	4.0	.4	.1	.9	4.6
2010–11	Idaho Stampede	D-League	30	30.2	.522	.000	.759	10.1	.8	.4	1.5	15.3
2011–12	Deutsche Bank Skyliners	German BBL	26	26.8	.477	.167	.773	6.3	1.3	.6	1.7	12.8
2012–13	Antalya BB	TBL	11	31.3	.561	.000	.837	7.3	1.5	.6	1.5	16.7
2013–14	Al-Rayyan	Qatari Basketball League	18	27.3	.545	.167	.917	8.1	2.2	.9	.5	13.6
2014–15	Al-Ittihad Jeddah	Saudi Premier League	?	?	?	?	?	?	?	?	?	?
