= 2006–07 Big East Conference men's basketball season =

American college basketball season

2006–07 Big East Conference Men's Basketball Season
- League: NCAA Division I
- Sport: Basketball
- Duration: November 10, 2006 through March 10, 2007
- Teams: 16
- TV partner: ESPN

Regular Season
- Champion: Georgetown (13–3)
- Season MVP: Jeff Green – Georgetown

Tournament
- Champions: Georgetown
- Finals MVP: Jeff Green – Georgetown

Basketball seasons
- 2005–06 2007–08

2006–07 Big East men's basketball standings
	Conf.				Overall
Team	W		L	PCT	W		L	PCT
No. 8 Georgetown †	13	–	3	.813	30	–	7	.811
No. 16 Louisville	12	–	4	.750	24	–	10	.706
No. 12 Pittsburgh	12	–	4	.750	29	–	8	.784
No. 17 Notre Dame	11	–	5	.688	24	–	8	.750
No. 20 Marquette	10	–	6	.625	24	–	10	.706
West Virginia	9	–	7	.563	27	–	9	.750
DePaul	9	–	7	.563	20	–	14	.588
Villanova	9	–	7	.563	22	–	11	.667
Providence	8	–	8	.500	18	–	13	.581
St. John's	7	–	9	.438	16	–	15	.516
Connecticut	6	–	10	.375	17	–	14	.548
*Seton Hall	4	–	12	.250	13	–	16	.448
*South Florida	3	–	13	.188	12	–	18	.400
*Rutgers	3	–	13	.188	10	–	19	.345
*Cincinnati	2	–	14	.125	11	–	19	.367
**Syracuse	0	–	6	.000	2	–	11	.154
† 2007 Big East tournament winner As of April 2, 2007; Rankings from AP Poll; *Did not qualify for 2007 Big East tournament **Syracuse had 22 regular season games and two postseason games vacated due to sanctions against the program; Syracuse′s disputed record was 10–6, 24–11.

The 2006–07 Big East Conference men's basketball season was the 28th in conference history, and involved its 16 full-time member schools.

Georgetown was the regular-season champion with a record of 13–3. Georgetown also won the Big East tournament championship.

== Season summary & highlights ==
- Georgetown was the regular-season champion with a record of 13–3. It was Georgetown's eighth conference championship or co-championship and third outright championship.
- Georgetown won its seventh Big East tournament championship and first since 1989.
- Syracuse became the first team with at least 10 wins in Big East Conference play to not receive an invitation to the NCAA tournament. Selection Committee Chairman Gary Walters said that some of the factors in not inviting Syracuse included the Orange playing an uneven in-conference schedule and having a weak non-conference schedule.
- West Virginia won the 2007 National Invitation Tournament championship.
- Due to NCAA sanctions imposed in March 2015 because of the Syracuse University athletics scandal, all 22 of Syracuse's wins from this season, including two postseason victories, later were vacated.

== Head coaches ==
School	Coach	Season	Notes
Cincinnati	Mick Cronin	1st	
Connecticut	Jim Calhoun	21st	
DePaul	Jerry Wainwright	2nd	
Georgetown	John Thompson III	3rd	
Louisville	Rick Pitino	6th	
Marquette	Tom Crean	8th	
Notre Dame	Mike Brey	7th	Big East Coach of the Year
Pittsburgh	Jamie Dixon	4th	
Providence	Tim Welsh	9th	
Rutgers	Fred Hill	1st	
St. John's	Norm Roberts	3rd	
Seton Hall	Bobby Gonzalez	1st	
South Florida	Robert McCullum	4th	Fired March 9, 2007
Syracuse	Jim Boeheim	31st	
Villanova	Jay Wright	6th	
West Virginia	John Beilein	5th	Resigned April 3, 2007

== Rankings ==
Pittsburgh was ranked in the Associated Press poll Top 25 all season, reaching No. 2 in three weeks and finishing at No. 12. Marqueette spent all but one week in the Top 25 and finished at No. 20. Georgetown, Louisville, and Notre Dame also appeared in the Top 25 and finished the season as ranked teams, with Georgetown ranked No. 8. Connecticut, Syracuse, and West Virginia also spent time in the Top 25.

2006–07 Big East Conference Weekly Rankings Key: ██ Increase in ranking. ██ Decrease in ranking.
AP Poll	Pre	11/13	11/20	11/27	12/4	12/11	12/18	12/25	1/1	1/8	1/15	1/22	1/29	2/5	2/12	2/19	2/26	3/5	Final
Cincinnati																			
Connecticut	18	21	18	20	19	14	14	12	18	24									
DePaul																			
Georgetown	8	8	14	18										22	14	12	9	9	8
Louisville																20	16	12	16
Marquette	16	16	13	8	17	20	19	18	15		24	15	14	11	12	16	20	18	20
Notre Dame						21	20	19	17	22	20	22	21				22	20	17
Pittsburgh	4	4	3	2	2	2	7	10	10	7	6	9	7	7	7	10	12	13	12
Providence																			
Rutgers																			
St. John's																			
Seton Hall																			
South Florida																			
Syracuse	20	18	17	15	21	23	23												
Villanova																			
West Virginia									25	21					23	22			

== Regular-season statistical leaders ==
Scoring
Name	School	PPG
Demetris Nichols	Syr	18.9
Herbert Hill	Prov	18.1
Curtis Sumpter	Vill	17.4
Russell Carter	ND	17.1
Brian Laing	SHU	16.5
Eugene Harvey	SHU	16.5

Rebounding
Name	School	RPG
Kentrell Gransberry	USF	11.4
Jeff Adrien	Conn	9.7
Aaron Gray	Pitt	9.5
Geoff McDermott	Prov	9.1
Herbert Hill	Prov	8.8

Assists
Name	School	APG
Eugene Lawrence	SJU	5.6
Alex Ruoff	WVU	5.3
Geoff McDermott	Prov	5.1
Dominic James	Mar	4.9
Darris Nichols	WVU	4.6

Steals
Name	School	SPG
Paul Gause	SHU	3.1
Jerel McNeal	Mar	2.6
Alex Ruoff	WVU	2.0
Dominic James	Mar	1.9
Geoff McDermott	Prov	1.9
Jerome Dyson	Conn	1.9

Blocks
Name	School	BPG
Hasheem Thabeet	Conn	3.8
McHugh Mattis	USF	3.6
Darryl Watkins	Syr	3.4
Herbert Hill	Prov	2.9
Roy Hibbert	GU	2.4

Field Goals
Name	School	FG%
Roy Hibbert	GU	.671
Herbert Hill	Prov	.640
Kentrell Gransberry	USF	.577
Aaron Gray	Pitt	.565
McHugh Mattis	USF	.553

3-Pt Field Goals
Name	School	3FG%
Frank Young	WVU	.433
Demetris Nichols	Syr	.417
Colin Falls	ND	.396
Russell Carter	ND	.394
Melvin Buckley	USF	.346

Free Throws
Name	School	FT%
Sharaud Curry	Prov	.901
Solomon Bozeman	USF	.884
Demetris Nichols	Syr	.850
Darris Nichols	WVU	.843
Eugene Harvey	SHU	.839

== Postseason ==
=== Big East tournament ===
==== Seeding ====
Teams were seeded in the Big East tournament based on conference record and tiebreakers. The No. 5 through No. 12 seeds played in the first round, and the No. 1 through No. 4 seeds received byes into the quarterfinal round. Teams which finished below 12th place in the conference after the application as necessary of tiebreakers did not qualify for the tournament

Seeding was (1) Georgetown, (2) Louisville, (3) Pittsburgh, (4) Notre Dame, (5) Syracuse, (6) Marquette, (7) West Virginia, (8) DePaul, (9) Villanova, (10) Providence, (11) St. John's, and (12) Connecticut. By finishing below 12th place, Cincinnati, Rutgers, Seton Hall, and South Florida did not qualify for the tournament.

The NCAA later vacated all of Syracuse's wins during the season, including its Big East Tournament victory, because of the use of an ineligible player.

==== Bracket ====
First round
8	DePaul	67
9	Villanova	75
5	~~Syracuse~~	78
12	Connecticut	65
6	#18 Marquette	76
11	St. John's	67
7	West Virginia	92
10	Providence	79

Quarterfinals
1	#9 Georgetown	62
9	Villanova	57
4	#20 Notre Dame	89
5	~~Syracuse~~	83
3	#13 Pittsburgh	89
6	#18 Marquette	79
2	#12 Louisville	82
7	West Virginia	71

Semifinals
1	#9 Georgetown	84
4	#20 Notre Dame	82
3	#13 Pittsburgh	65
2	#12 Louisville	59

Championship game
1	#9 Georgetown	65
3	#13 Pittsburgh	42

=== NCAA tournament ===
Six Big East teams received bids to the NCAA Tournament. Marquette, Notre Dame, and Villanova lost in the first round, Louisville in the second round, and Pittsburgh in the regional semifinals. Georgetown reached the Final Four for the first time since 1985 and lost to Ohio State.

School	Region	Seed	Round 1	Round 2	Sweet 16	Elite 8	Final 4
Georgetown	East	2	15 Belmont, W 80–55	7 Boston College, W 62–55	6 Vanderbilt, W 66–65	1 North Carolina, W 96–84^{(OT)}	S1 Ohio State, L 67–60
Pittsburgh	West	3	14 Wright State, W 79–58	11 VCU, W 84–79^{(OT)}	2 UCLA, L 64–55		
Louisville	South	6	11 Stanford, W 78–58	3 Texas A&M, L 72–69			
Notre Dame	Midwest	6	11 Winthrop, L 74–64				
Marquette	East	8	9 Michigan State, L 61–49				
Villanova	West	9	8 Kentucky, L 67–58				

=== National Invitation Tournament ===
Four Big East teams received bids to the National Invitation Tournament, with West Virginia seeded No. 1 in the East Region. Providence lost in the first round and DePaul and Syracuse in the quarterfinals. West Virginia won the tournament championship.

The Syracuse–San Diego State game played at the Carrier Dome in Syracuse, New York, on March 19, 2007, drew 26,752, setting a new attendance record for an NIT game. It surpassed the crowd of 23,522 that attended a game at Kentucky during the 1979 NIT.

The NCAA later vacated all of Syracuse's wins during the season, including its NIT victories, because of the use of an ineligible player.

School	Region	Seed	Round 1	Round 2	Quarterfinals	Semifinals	Final
West Virginia	East	1	8 Delaware State, W 74–50	4 UMass, W 90–77	6 NC State, W 71–66	N1 Mississippi State, W 63–62	S1 Clemson, W 78–73
~~Syracuse~~	South	2	7 South Alabama, W 79–73	6 San Diego State, W 80–64	1 Clemson, L 74–70		
DePaul	West	3	6 Hofstra, W 83–71	2 Kansas State, W 70–65	1 Air Force, L 52–51		
Providence	North	5	4 Bradley, L 90–78				

== Awards and honors ==
=== Big East Conference ===
Player of the Year:

- Jeff Green, Georgetown, F Jr.

Defensive Player of the Year:

- Jerel McNeal, Marquette, G, So.

Rookie of the Year:

- Scottie Reynolds, Villanova, G, Fr.

Most Improved Player:

- Herbert Hill, Providence, F Sr.

Coach of the Year:

- Mike Brey, Notre Dame (7th season)

All-Big East First Team

- Russell Carter, Notre Dame, g, Sr., 6 ft 4 in (193 cm), 220 lb (100 kg), Paulsboro, N.J.
- Frank Young, West Virginia, F Sr., 6 ft 5 in (196 cm), 210 lb (95 kg), Tallahassee, Fla.
- Curtis Sumpter, Villanova, F Sr., 6 ft 7 in (201 cm), 225 lb (102 kg), Brooklyn, N.Y.
- Demetris Nichols, Syracuse, F Sr., 6 ft 8 in (203 cm), 216 lb (98 kg), Barrington, R.I.
- Lamont Hamilton, St. John's, F Sr., 6 ft 10 in (208 cm), 240 lb (109 kg), Brooklyn, N.Y.
- Herbert Hill, Providence, F Sr., 6 ft 10 in (208 cm), 240 lb (109 kg), Kinston, N.C.
- Aaron Gray, Pittsburgh, C Sr., 7 ft 0 in (213 cm), 270 lb (122 kg), Emmaus, Pa.
- Colin Falls, Notre Dame, G Sr., 6 ft 5 in (196 cm), 200 lb (91 kg), Park Ridge, Ill.
- Dominic James, Marquette, G, So., 5 ft 11 in (180 cm), 185 lb (84 kg), Richmond, Ind.
- Roy Hibbert, Georgetown, C Jr., 7 ft 2 in (218 cm), 278 lb (126 kg), Adelphi, Md.
- Jeff Green, Georgetown, F Jr., 6 ft 9 in (206 cm), 235 lb (107 kg), Hyattsville, Md.

All-Big East Second Team:

- Jerel McNeal, Marquette, G, So., 6 ft 3 in (191 cm), 200 lb (91 kg), Chicago, Ill.
- Jeff Adrien, Connecticut, F, So., 6 ft 7 in (201 cm), 243 lb (110 kg), Brookline, Mass.
- Terrence Williams, Louisville, F, So., 6 ft 6 in (198 cm), 220 lb (100 kg), Seattle, Wash.
- Levance Fields, Pittsburgh, G, So., 5 ft 10 in (178 cm), 190 lb (86 kg), Brooklyn, N.Y.
- David Padgett, Louisville, C Jr., 6 ft 11 in (211 cm), 250 lb (113 kg), Reno, Nev.
- Brian Laing, Seton Hall, G Jr., 6 ft 5 in (196 cm), 216 lb (98 kg), The Bronx, N.Y.
- Kentrell Gransberry, South Florida, C Jr., 6 ft 9 in (206 cm), 270 lb (122 kg), Baton Rouge, La.
- Wilson Chandler, DePaul, F, So., 6 ft 8 in (203 cm), 220 lb (100 kg), Benton Harbor, Mich.
- Scottie Reynolds, Villanova, G, Fr., 6 ft 2 in (188 cm), 195 lb (88 kg), Herndon, Va.
- Sammy Mejía, DePaul, G Sr., 6 ft 6 in (198 cm), 195 lb (88 kg), The Bronx, N.Y.

Big East All-Rookie Team:

- Deonta Vaughn, Cincinnati, G, Fr., 6 ft 1 in (185 cm), 190 lb (86 kg), Indianapolis, Ind.
- Hasheem Thabeet, Connecticut, C, Fr., 7 ft 3 in (221 cm), 263 lb (119 kg), Dar es Salaam, Tanzania
- Jerome Dyson, Connecticut, G, Fr., 6 ft 3 in (191 cm), 190 lb (86 kg), Potomac, Md.
- DaJuan Summers, Georgetown, F, Fr., 6 ft 8 in (203 cm), 236 lb (107 kg), Baltimore, Md.
- Édgar Sosa, Louisville, G, Fr., 6 ft 2 in (188 cm), 175 lb (79 kg), New York, N.Y.
- Luke Harangody, Notre Dame, F, Fr., 6 ft 8 in (203 cm), 246 lb (112 kg), Schererville, Ind.
- Tory Jackson, Notre Dame, G, Fr., 5 ft 11 in (180 cm), 195 lb (88 kg), Saginaw, Mich.
- Eugene Harvey, Seton Hall, G, Fr., 6 ft 0 in (183 cm), 184 lb (83 kg), Brooklyn, N.Y.
- Paul Harris, Syracuse, F, Fr., 6 ft 5 in (196 cm), 230 lb (104 kg), Niagara Falls, N.Y.
- Scottie Reynolds, Villanova, G, Fr., 6 ft 2 in (188 cm), 195 lb (88 kg), Herndon, Va.
- Da'Sean Butler, West Virginia, F, Fr., 6 ft 7 in (201 cm), 230 lb (104 kg), Newark, N.J.

=== All-Americans ===
The following players were selected to the 2007 Associated Press All-America teams.

Third Team All-America:

- Jeff Green, Georgetown, Key Stats: 14.3 ppg, 6.4 rpg, 3.2 apg, 1.2 bpg, 51.3 FG%, 37.5 3P%, 528 points

AP Honorable Mention

- Roy Hibbert, Georgetown
- Dominic James, Marquette
- Demetris Nichols, Syracuse
- Curtis Sumpter, Villanova

== See also ==
- 2006–07 NCAA Division I men's basketball season
- 2006–07 Cincinnati Bearcats men's basketball team
- 2006–07 Connecticut Huskies men's basketball team
- 2006–07 Georgetown Hoyas men's basketball team
- 2006–07 Louisville Cardinals men's basketball team
- 2006–07 Marquette Golden Eagles men's basketball team
- 2006–07 Notre Dame Fighting Irish men's basketball team
- 2006–07 Pittsburgh Panthers men's basketball team
- 2006–07 St. John's Red Storm men's basketball team
- 2006–07 Syracuse Orange men's basketball team
- 2006–07 Villanova Wildcats men's basketball team
- 2006–07 West Virginia Mountaineers men's basketball team
