= Jeff Green (basketball) =

American basketball player (born 1986)

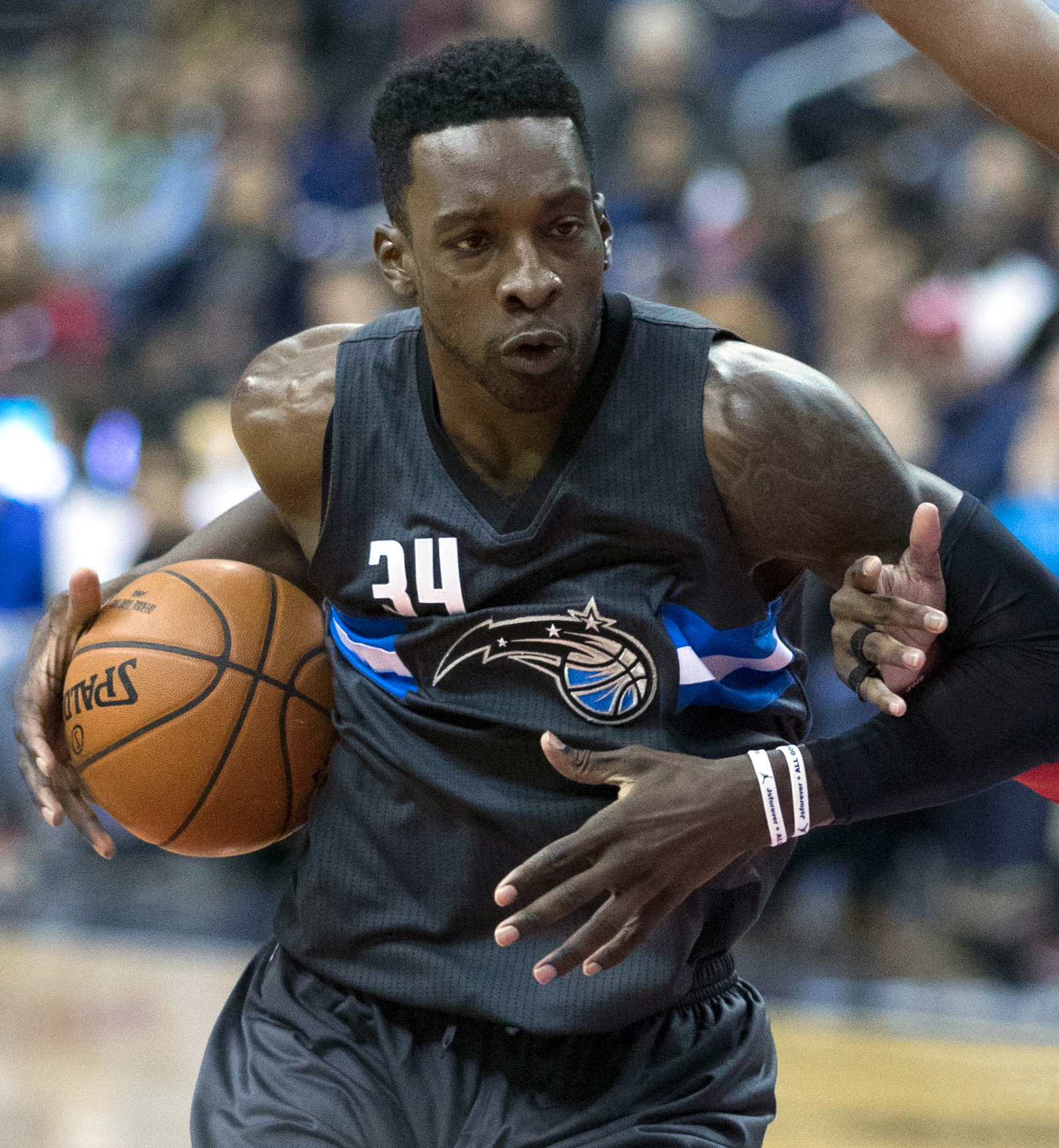
- Green with the Orlando Magic in 2017

Free agent
- Position: Power forward

Personal information
- Born: August 28, 1986 (age 40) Hyattsville, Maryland, U.S.
- Listed height: 6 ft 8 in (2.03 m)
- Listed weight: 235 lb (107 kg)

Career information
- High school: Northwestern (Hyattsville, Maryland)
- College: Georgetown (2004–2007)
- NBA draft: 2007: 1st round, 5th overall pick
- Drafted by: Boston Celtics
- Playing career: 2007–present

Career history
- 2007–2011: Seattle SuperSonics / Oklahoma City Thunder
- 2011, 2012–2015: Boston Celtics
- 2015–2016: Memphis Grizzlies
- 2016: Los Angeles Clippers
- 2016–2017: Orlando Magic
- 2017–2018: Cleveland Cavaliers
- 2018–2019: Washington Wizards
- 2019: Utah Jazz
- 2020: Houston Rockets
- 2020–2021: Brooklyn Nets
- 2021–2023: Denver Nuggets
- 2023–2026: Houston Rockets

Career highlights
- NBA champion (2023); NBA All-Rookie First Team (2008); Second-team All-American – USBWA (2007); Third-team All-American – AP, NABC (2007); Big East Player of the Year (2007); First-team All-Big East (2007); Second-team All-Big East (2006); Big East tournament MVP (2007); Big East Rookie of the Year (2005)
- Stats at NBA.com
- Stats at Basketball Reference

Jeffrey Lynn Green (born August 28, 1986) is an American professional basketball player who last played for the Houston Rockets of the National Basketball Association (NBA). As of 2025–26, he has played for 11 NBA teams in 18 seasons.

A forward, Green played three seasons of college basketball for the Georgetown Hoyas. After entering the 2007 NBA draft, he was selected with the fifth overall pick by the Boston Celtics, but was traded to the Seattle SuperSonics. In 2008, following his rookie season, Green was named to the NBA All-Rookie First Team. He underwent successful open-heart surgery in 2012 and continued his playing career. Green won his first NBA championship as a member of the Denver Nuggets in 2023.

As of 2025, Green holds the record for having played with the most number of teammates in the NBA with 272.

== Early life ==
Green was born on August 28, 1986, in Cheverly, Maryland, to Jeffrey Green Sr. and Felicia Akinkugbe. He was raised in College Park, Maryland, and then attended Northwestern High School in Hyattsville, Maryland, where he led the NHS Wildcats to the state basketball championship in 2004. At Northwestern High School, Green received the nickname “Jeff” from his friend and mentor, Graham Peterson, a nickname revised by LeBron James in 2009.

== College career ==
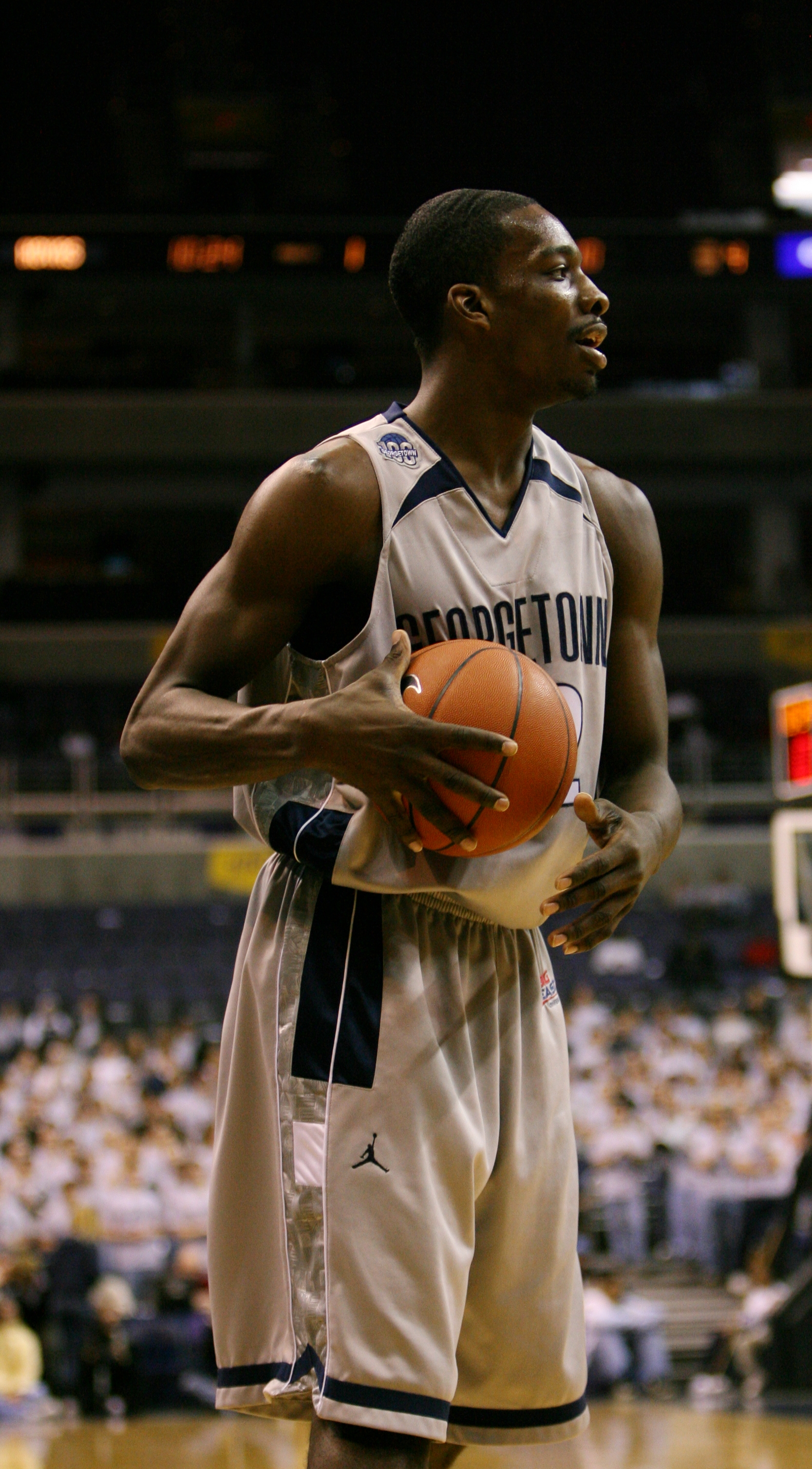
Green in December 2006

Green was recruited to Georgetown University by coach Craig Esherick in 2003. Esherick was fired before Green arrived on campus and John Thompson III was hired as the new coach. The two top recruits of Esherick's tenure, Green and center Roy Hibbert, were the key components of Thompson's future success. Thompson stated in a Sports Illustrated interview: "You'll stop and think when I say this, but it's true: Jeff Green is the smartest player I've ever coached. You would know this better than most: that's a hell of a statement." Green won the 2005 Big East Rookie of the Year award along with Rudy Gay of the University of Connecticut. He was named to the All-Big East Second Team in 2006 along with teammate Roy Hibbert. In 2007, Green was named the Big East Player of the Year. He and Hibbert were unanimous selections to the All-Big East First Team. After his 30-point performance in the 2007 Big East tournament semifinal against Notre Dame and his 21-point performance in the championship against Pittsburgh, Green was named Most Outstanding Player of the tournament, as the Hoyas won their first Big East title since 1989. He led the Hoyas to the Final Four of the 2007 NCAA tournament, beating Belmont and Boston College in the first two rounds. Green helped Georgetown beat Vanderbilt with a game-winning shot after a controversial no-call in the game's closing seconds as well as fearlessly leading the Hoyas to victory against No. 1 seed UNC in a stunning second-half comeback victory and bringing the Hoyas back to their first Final Four since Patrick Ewing led them to the 1985 national championship game. The Hoyas eventually lost to Greg Oden and Ohio State, bringing their remarkable title run to a close as well as Green's collegiate playing career, as he chose to forgo his senior year and entered the NBA draft. Green spent the next four summers taking classes at Georgetown and graduated in 2012 with a degree in English and a minor in theology.

== Professional career ==
=== Seattle SuperSonics/Oklahoma City Thunder (2007–2011) ===
On June 28, 2007, Green was selected with the fifth overall pick in the 2007 NBA draft by the Boston Celtics. He was later traded to the Seattle SuperSonics alongside Wally Szczerbiak and Delonte West in exchange for Ray Allen and Glen Davis. On April 6, 2008, Green scored a then career-high 35 points against the Denver Nuggets. Green made the NBA All-Rookie First Team in 2008 after averaging 10.5 points, 4.7 rebounds and 1.5 assists in 80 games.

The Sonics were sold and moved to Oklahoma City before the start of the 2008–09 season, becoming the Thunder. In January 2009, Green hit his first career game-winner, lifting the Thunder to a 122–121 victory over the Golden State Warriors.

In the 2009–10 season, Green played and started in all 82 games. On December 1, 2010, he set a new career high with 37 points against the New Jersey Nets.

=== Boston Celtics (2011–2015) ===
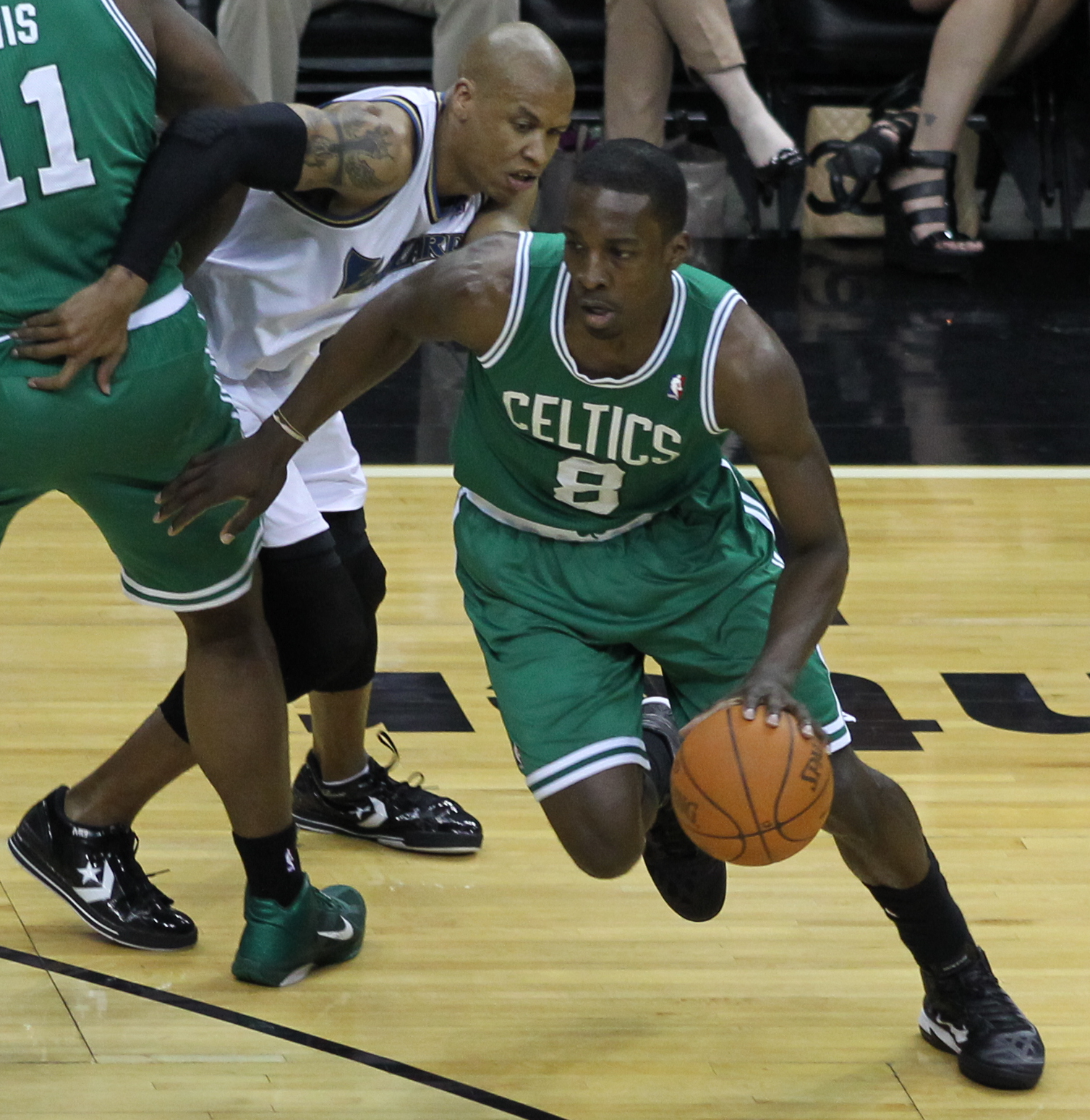
Green in April 2011

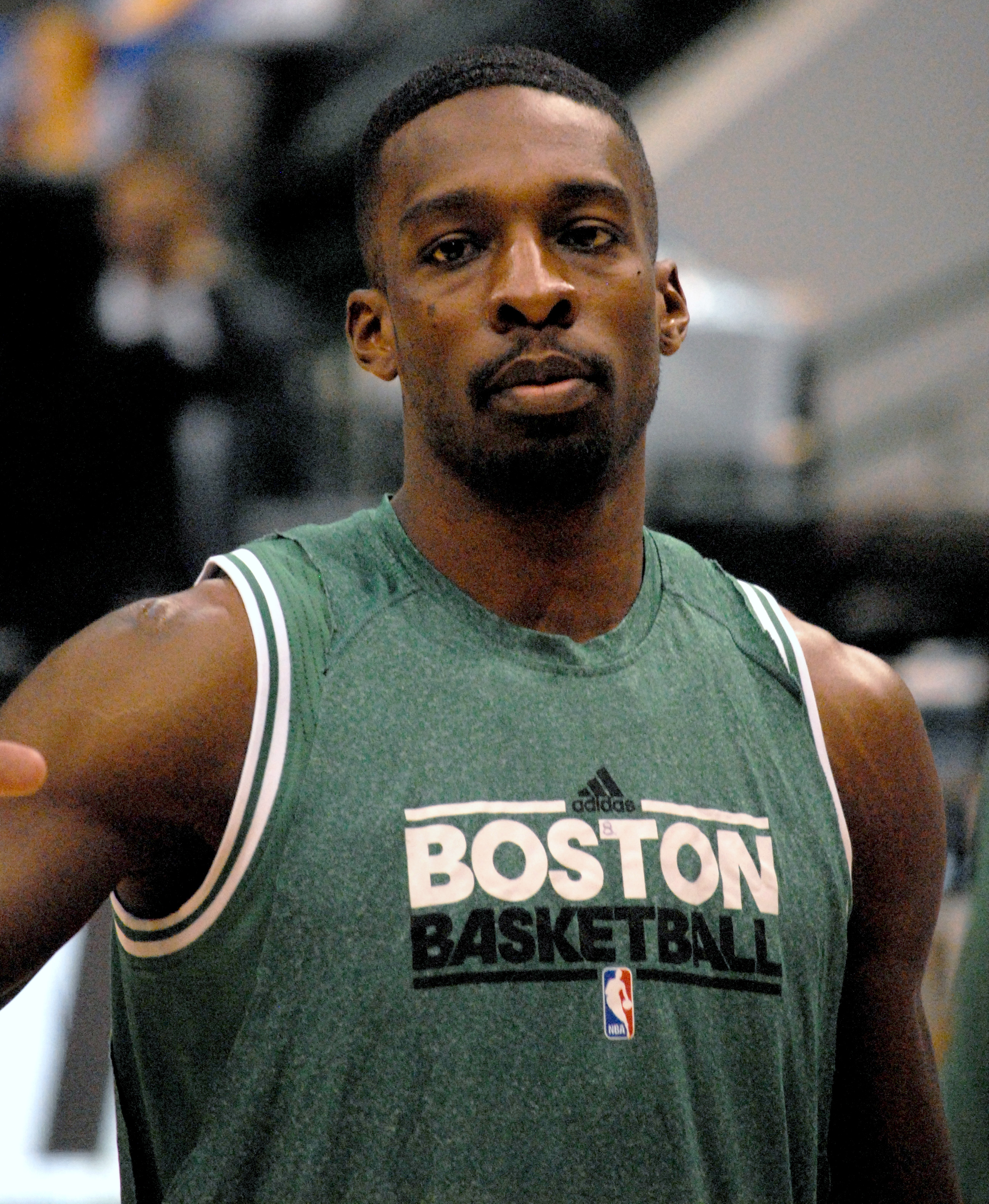
Green in March 2013

On February 24, 2011, Green was traded, along with Nenad Krstić and a 2012 first-round pick, to the Boston Celtics in exchange for Kendrick Perkins and Nate Robinson. Green recorded a double-double in his first start as a Celtic against the Washington Wizards on April 11, recording 20 points, a career-high-tying 15 rebounds, four assists and two steals. Green improved his field goal percentage after the trade to the Celtics, shooting 48.5 percent from the floor in 26 games after shooting 43.7 percent with the Thunder.

On December 10, 2011, following the conclusion of the NBA lockout, Green re-signed with the Celtics on a one-year, $9 million contract. Eight days later, his contract was voided by the Celtics after a routine physical examination detected an aortic aneurysm. Green subsequently underwent heart surgery in January 2012 and missed the entire 2011–12 season. Former teammate Kevin Durant dedicated his season to Green. Green used his downtime not only to rehab from surgery but to complete his coursework at Georgetown, graduating in May 2012 with a degree in English and a minor in theology.

On August 22, 2012, Green re-signed with the Celtics on a four-year, $36 million contract. On March 18, 2013, he scored a career-high 43 points in a 105–103 loss to the Miami Heat. On April 3, Green scored 34 points against the Detroit Pistons.

In 2013–14, Green played and started in all 82 games for the Celtics following the departure of Paul Pierce and Kevin Garnett in the off-season. He subsequently had a career-best season as he averaged a career-high 16.9 points per game. On January 22, Green scored 39 points against the Wizards. On March 16 against the New Orleans Pelicans, he had a second 39-point game.

Over the first two months of the 2014–15 season, Green averaged a career-best 17.6 points per game.

=== Memphis Grizzlies (2015–2016) ===
On January 12, 2015, Green was traded to the Memphis Grizzlies in a three-team deal involving the Celtics and the New Orleans Pelicans. He made his Grizzlies debut two days later, recording 10 points and three rebounds off the bench in a 103–92 victory over the Brooklyn Nets. On June 18, Green exercised his player option with the Grizzlies for the 2015–16 season.

On December 13, 2015, Green scored a season-high 26 points in a loss to the Miami Heat. He topped that mark on January 25, 2016, scoring 30 points off the bench in a 108–102 overtime victory over the Orlando Magic. In that game, Green converted an 11-footer with 1.3 seconds left for a 100–100 tie at the end of regulation.

=== Los Angeles Clippers (2016) ===
On February 18, 2016, Green was traded to the Los Angeles Clippers in exchange for Lance Stephenson and a future protected first-round pick. Two days later, he made his Clippers debut in a 115–112 loss to the Golden State Warriors, recording five points, two rebounds and one assist in 20 minutes off the bench. On February 26, Green made his first start for the Clippers, scoring 22 points in 31 minutes of action in a 117–107 victory over the Sacramento Kings.

=== Orlando Magic (2016–2017) ===
On July 7, 2016, Green signed a one-year, $15 million contract with the Orlando Magic. He made his Magic debut in their season opener on October 26, scoring seven points off the bench in a 108–96 loss to the Miami Heat. On April 5, 2017, Green was shut down for the rest of the season due to lower back soreness that plagued him throughout the season. Green missed the final nine games of the season.

=== Cleveland Cavaliers (2017–2018) ===
On July 11, 2017, Green signed with the Cleveland Cavaliers on a minimum contract. On May 27, 2018, he scored 19 points starting in place of the injured Kevin Love, helping the Cavaliers defeat the Celtics in Game 7 of the Eastern Conference finals. The Cavaliers played the Golden State Warriors in the 2018 NBA Finals, where they were defeated in four games.

=== Washington Wizards (2018–2019) ===
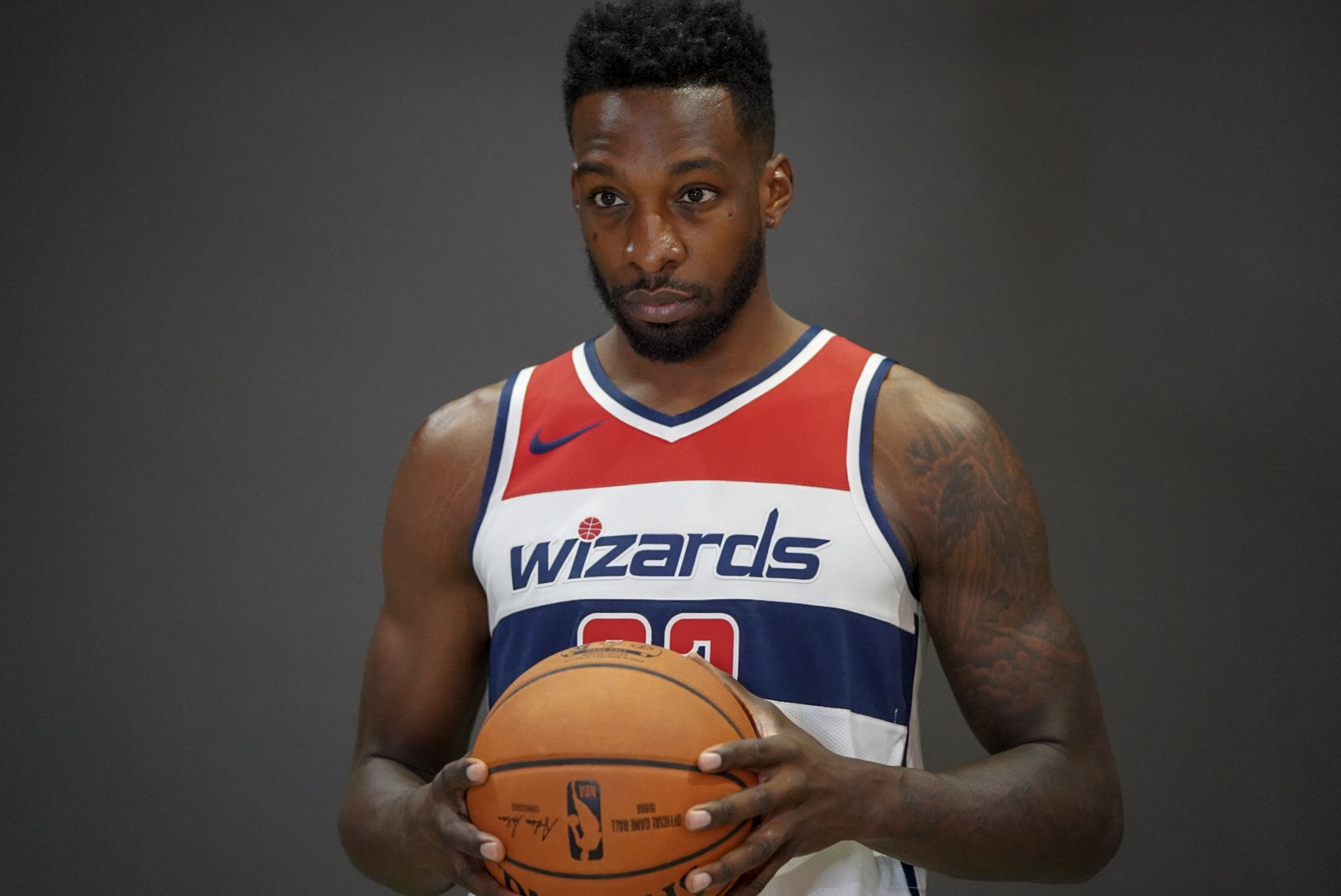
Green in 2018

On July 10, 2018, Green signed with his hometown team the Washington Wizards on a minimum contract. He made his Wizards debut on October 18, recording 17 points and four rebounds in a narrow 113–112 loss to the Miami Heat. On February 4, 2019, Green scored a season-high 26 points, alongside five rebounds and five assists, in a 137–129 loss to the Atlanta Hawks.

=== Utah Jazz (2019) ===
On July 20, 2019, Green signed a one-year, minimum deal with the Utah Jazz. He made his Jazz debut on October 23, scoring five points in a 100–95 victory over the Oklahoma City Thunder. On December 24, Green was waived.

=== Houston Rockets (2020) ===
On February 18, 2020, Green was signed by the Houston Rockets to a 10-day contract. On February 28, the Houston Rockets announced that they had signed him for the rest of the season. The signing reunited Green with former Thunder teammates James Harden, Russell Westbrook, and Thabo Sefolosha.

=== Brooklyn Nets (2020–2021) ===
On November 23, 2020, Green signed a one-year, minimum contract with the Brooklyn Nets, reuniting him with former Sonics and Thunder teammate Kevin Durant and once again with James Harden upon his trade to the Nets. On June 15, in the Eastern Conference Semifinal game five against the Milwaukee Bucks, Green scored a season-high 27 points to help lead the Nets to victory.

=== Denver Nuggets (2021–2023) ===
On August 12, 2021, Green signed a two-year, $9 million contract with the Denver Nuggets. He made his Nuggets debut on October 20, scoring 13 points in a 110–98 victory over the Phoenix Suns. On January 15, 2022, Green logged a season-high 26 points, alongside three rebounds and four assists, in a 133–96 win over the Los Angeles Lakers.

Green became an NBA champion when the Nuggets defeated the Miami Heat in five games in the 2023 NBA Finals.

=== Return to Houston (2023–2026) ===
On July 7, 2023, Green signed a two-year, $16 million contract with the Houston Rockets, returning to the franchise for a second stint.

On July 10, 2025, Green re-signed with the Rockets on a one-year, minimum contract.

== Personal life ==
Green got the nickname "Uncle Jeff" in 2009 after LeBron James compared him to "that uncle you used to play basketball with at the Y who will punish you down on the blocks and you get mad." Green himself adopted the nickname as his Twitter handle.

== Career statistics ==
Legend
GP	Games played	GS	Games started	MPG	Minutes per game
FG%	Field goal percentage	3P%	3-point field goal percentage	FT%	Free throw percentage
RPG	Rebounds per game	APG	Assists per game	SPG	Steals per game
BPG	Blocks per game	PPG	Points per game	**Bold**	Career high
†	Won an NBA championship	*	Led the league

=== Regular season ===
Year	Team	GP	GS	MPG	FG%	3P%	FT%	RPG	APG	SPG	BPG	PPG
2007–08	Seattle	80	52	28.2	.427	.276	.744	4.7	1.5	.6	.6	10.5
2008–09	Oklahoma City	78	78	36.8	.446	.389	.788	**6.6**	**2.0**	1.0	.4	16.5
2009–10	Oklahoma City	**82***	**82***	**37.1**	.453	.333	.740	6.0	1.6	**1.3**	**.9**	15.1
2010–11	Oklahoma City	49	49	37.0	.437	.304	.818	5.6	1.8	.8	.4	15.2
2010–11	Boston	26	2	23.5	.485	.296	.794	3.3	.7	.5	.6	9.8
2012–13	Boston	81	17	27.8	.467	.385	.808	3.9	1.6	.7	.8	12.8
2013–14	Boston	**82**	**82***	34.2	.412	.341	.795	4.6	1.7	.7	.6	16.9
2014–15	Boston	33	33	33.1	.434	.305	.840	4.3	1.6	.8	.4	**17.6**
2014–15	Memphis	45	37	30.3	.427	.362	.825	4.2	1.8	.6	.5	13.1
2015–16	Memphis	53	31	29.1	.431	.309	.800	4.5	1.8	.8	.4	12.2
2015–16	L.A. Clippers	27	10	26.3	.427	.325	.615	3.4	1.5	.7	.8	10.9
2016–17	Orlando	69	11	22.2	.394	.275	.863	3.1	1.2	.5	.2	9.2
2017–18	Cleveland	78	14	23.4	.477	.312	.868	3.2	1.3	.5	.4	10.8
2018–19	Washington	77	44	27.2	.475	.347	.888	4.0	1.8	.6	.5	12.3
2019–20	Utah	30	2	18.4	.385	.327	.778	2.7	.7	.4	.3	7.8
2019–20	Houston	18	2	22.6	**.564**	.354	.857	2.9	1.7	.8	.5	12.2
2020–21	Brooklyn	68	38	27.0	.492	**.412**	.776	3.9	1.6	.5	.4	11.0
2021–22	Denver	75	63	24.7	.524	.315	.833	3.1	1.3	.4	.4	10.3
2022–23†	Denver	56	4	19.5	.488	.288	.744	2.6	1.2	.3	.3	7.8
2023–24	Houston	78	6	16.8	.456	.331	.819	2.3	.9	.2	.4	6.5
2024–25	Houston	32	3	12.4	.504	.367	.808	1.8	.6	.2	.1	5.4
2025–26	Houston	30	0	5.8	.368	.273	**1.000**	.8	.3	.1	.1	2.2
Career		1,247	659	26.8	.450	.337	.804	3.9	1.4	.6	.5	11.6

=== Playoffs ===
Year	Team	GP	GS	MPG	FG%	3P%	FT%	RPG	APG	SPG	BPG	PPG
2010	Oklahoma City	6	**6**	37.3	.329	.296	.850	4.7	1.7	.7	.5	11.8
2011	Boston	9	0	19.2	.434	.438	.722	2.7	.2	.6	.4	7.3
2013	Boston	6	**6**	**43.0**	.435	.455	.844	**5.3**	**2.3**	.3	**.7**	**20.3**
2015	Memphis	11	2	27.0	.333	.222	.846	4.7	1.7	.5	.5	8.9
2016	L.A. Clippers	6	1	26.5	**.457**	.400	.600	3.2	.7	**1.0**	.3	10.2
2018	Cleveland	**22**	2	23.8	.408	.300	.717	2.4	1.5	.3	**.7**	7.7
2020	Houston	12	0	28.4	.495	.426	.824	5.0	1.6	.5	.5	11.6
2021	Brooklyn	6	1	24.7	.485	.556	.875	2.8	1.7	.5	.3	8.2
2022	Denver	5	5	22.6	.353	.375	.800	3.6	.4	.6	.4	3.8
2023†	Denver	20	0	17.2	.452	.321	**.895**	1.6	.7	.3	.4	4.1
2025	Houston	3	0	1.7	.333	**1.000**	–	.3	.0	.0	.0	1.0
2026	Houston	2	0	5.5	.000	.000	–	.0	.0	.0	.0	.0
Career		108	23	24.0	.414	.366	.786	3.1	1.2	.4	.5	8.1

=== College ===
Year	Team	GP	GS	MPG	FG%	3P%	FT%	RPG	APG	SPG	BPG	PPG
2004–05	Georgetown	32	32	**33.8**	.502	**.400**	.699	**6.6**	2.9	**1.0**	**1.6**	13.1
2005–06	Georgetown	33	33	32.5	.445	.315	.624	6.5	**3.3**	.9	1.0	11.9
2006–07	Georgetown	**37**	**37**	33.3	**.513**	.375	**.775**	6.4	3.2	0.8	1.2	**14.3**
Career		102	102	33.2	.488	.359	.700	6.5	3.1	.9	1.2	13.1

== See also ==
- List of NBA career games played leaders
