= 2006–07 Providence Friars men's basketball team =

American college basketball season

2006–07 Providence Friars men's basketball
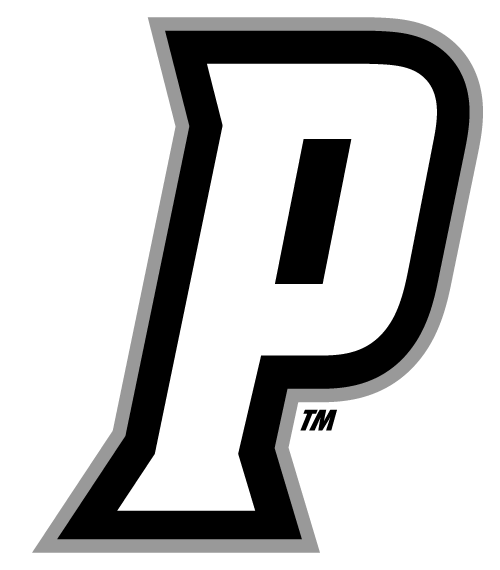

NIT, Round 1
- Conference: Big East Conference
- Record: 18–13 (8–8 Big East)
- Head coach: Tim Welsh (9th season)
- Home arena: Dunkin' Donuts Center

2006–07 Big East men's basketball standings
	Conf.				Overall
Team	W		L	PCT	W		L	PCT
No. 8 Georgetown †	13	–	3	.813	30	–	7	.811
No. 16 Louisville	12	–	4	.750	24	–	10	.706
No. 12 Pittsburgh	12	–	4	.750	29	–	8	.784
No. 17 Notre Dame	11	–	5	.688	24	–	8	.750
No. 20 Marquette	10	–	6	.625	24	–	10	.706
West Virginia	9	–	7	.563	27	–	9	.750
DePaul	9	–	7	.563	20	–	14	.588
Villanova	9	–	7	.563	22	–	11	.667
Providence	8	–	8	.500	18	–	13	.581
St. John's	7	–	9	.438	16	–	15	.516
Connecticut	6	–	10	.375	17	–	14	.548
*Seton Hall	4	–	12	.250	13	–	16	.448
*South Florida	3	–	13	.188	12	–	18	.400
*Rutgers	3	–	13	.188	10	–	19	.345
*Cincinnati	2	–	14	.125	11	–	19	.367
**Syracuse	0	–	6	.000	2	–	11	.154
† 2007 Big East tournament winner As of April 2, 2007; Rankings from AP Poll; *Did not qualify for 2007 Big East tournament **Syracuse had 22 regular season games and two postseason games vacated due to sanctions against the program; Syracuse′s disputed record was 10–6, 24–11.

The 2006–07 Providence Friars men's basketball team represented Providence College in the Big East Conference. The team finished with a 18–13 record.

The Friars were eliminated by West Virginia in round 1 of the Big East tournament. On March 14, 2007, they were eliminated in round 1 of the NIT by Bradley.

== Roster ==
2006–07 Providence Friars men's basketball team
Players
Coaches

Pos.	#	Name	Height	Weight	Year	Previous school	Hometown
G	1	Jeff Xavier	6 ft 1 in (1.85 m)	190 lb (86 kg)	Jr	St. Raphael Academy	Pawtucket, Rhode Island
G	4	Sharaud Curry	5 ft 10 in (1.78 m)	170 lb (77 kg)	RS So	Joseph Wheeler High School	Gainesville, Georgia
G	5	Dwain Williams	—	170 lb (77 kg)	Fr	Vista Murrieta High School	San Diego, California
G	10	Luke Burchett (W)	—	185 lb (84 kg)	Fr	Fenwick High School	Western Springs, Illinois
G/F	11	Geoff McDermott	6 ft 7 in (2.01 m)	240 lb (109 kg)	So	New Rochelle High School	New Rochelle, New York
G	13	Weyinmi Efejuku	6 ft 5 in (1.96 m)	205 lb (93 kg)	So	Brewster Academy	Fresh Meadows, New York
F/C	15	Herbert Hill	6 ft 10 in (2.08 m)	240 lb (109 kg)	RS Sr	Kinston High School	Kinston, North Carolina
F	21	Chris Baudinet (W)	6 ft 5 in (1.96 m)	210 lb (95 kg)	So	Taft School	Watertown, Connecticut
G	23	Brian McKenzie	6 ft 4 in (1.93 m)	190 lb (86 kg)	Fr	Xaverian High School	Brooklyn, New York
C	32	Randall Hanke	6 ft 11 in (2.11 m)	240 lb (109 kg)	RS Jr	Trinity-Pawling School	New York, New York
F	33	Charles Burch	6 ft 7 in (2.01 m)	225 lb (102 kg)	Jr	Tabor Academy	Dorchester, Massachusetts
F	34	Jonathan Kale	6 ft 8 in (2.03 m)	250 lb (113 kg)	So	St. Andrew's School	Mattapan, Massachusetts
C	55	Ray Hall	6 ft 11 in (2.11 m)	275 lb (125 kg)	Fr	J. K. Mullen High School	Denver, Colorado

Head coach

- Tim Welsh (SUNY Potsdam)

Assistant coach(es)

Vince Cautero

Legend

- (C) Team captain
- (S) Suspended
- (I) Ineligible
- (W) Walk-on
- Injured
- Current redshirt

Roster

== Schedule and results ==
Date time, TV	Rank^{#}	Opponent^{#}	Result	Record	Site (attendance) city, state
Exhibition
Nov. 2, 2006*; 7:30 p.m.		New Haven	W 97–51		Dunkin' Donuts Center; Providence, RI
Nov. 7, 2006*; 7:30 p.m.		EA Sports All-Stars	W 82–77		Dunkin' Donuts Center; Providence, RI
Non-conference regular season
Nov. 14, 2006*; 7:30 p.m.		Fairleigh Dickinson	W 96–71	1–0	Dunkin' Donuts Center; Providence, RI
Nov. 18, 2006*; 7:30 p.m.		Brown	L 41–51	1–1	Dunkin' Donuts Center; Providence, RI
Nov. 22, 2006*; 7:30 p.m.		No. 23 Boston College	W 73–64	2–1	Dunkin' Donuts Center; Providence, RI
Nov. 26, 2006*; 7:30 p.m.		George Washington	W 86–67	3–1	Dunkin' Donuts Center; Providence, RI
Nov. 28, 2006*; 7:30 p.m.		Columbia	W 81–55	4–1	Dunkin' Donuts Center; Providence, RI
Dec. 2, 2006*; 2:00 p.m.		Rhode Island	W 95–66	5–1	Dunkin' Donuts Center; Providence, RI
Dec. 4, 2006*; 7:30 p.m.		Fairfield	W 67–50	6–1	Dunkin' Donuts Center; Providence, RI
Dec. 6, 2006*; 7:00 p.m., FSN		at No. 7 Florida	L 67–85	6–2	O'Connell Center; Gainesville, FL
Dec. 9, 2006*; 7:30 p.m.		Maine	W 94–79	7–2	Dunkin' Donuts Center; Providence, RI
Dec. 19, 2006*; 7:30 p.m.		Holy Cross	W 77–68	8–2	Dunkin' Donuts Center (7,785); Providence, RI
Dec. 22, 2006*; 7:30 p.m.		Harvard	W 101–92	9–2	Dunkin' Donuts Center; Providence, RI
Dec. 29, 2006*; 9:30 p.m.		vs. Florida State	L 62–92	9–3	St. Pete Times Forum; Tampa, Florida
Jan. 2, 2007*; 7:30 p.m.		Longwood	W 107–69	10–3	Dunkin' Donuts Center; Providence, RI
Big East regular season
Jan. 4, 2007; 7:30 p.m.		No. 15 Marquette	W 74–59	11–3 (1–0)	Dunkin' Donuts Center; Providence, RI
Jan. 6, 2007; 8:00 p.m.		Seton Hall	W 91–69	12–3 (2–0)	Dunkin' Donuts Center; Providence, RI
Jan. 13, 2007; 12:00 p.m.		at Louisville	L 63–78	12–4 (2–1)	Freedom Hall; Louisville, KY
Jan. 17, 2007; 7:30 p.m.		at Seton Hall	L 68–69	12–5 (2–2)	Izod Center; East Rutherford, NJ
Jan. 20, 2007; 7:30 p.m.		Rutgers	W 78–63	13–5 (3–2)	Dunkin' Donuts Center; Providence, RI
Jan. 23, 2007; 7:30 p.m.		Villanova	L 73–82	13–6 (3–3)	Dunkin' Donuts Center; Providence, RI
Jan. 27, 2007; 12:00 p.m., FSN New York		at UConn	W 84–72	14–6 (4–3)	Harry A. Gampel Pavilion (16,294); Storrs, CT
Feb. 3, 2007; 2:00 p.m.		at No. 14 Marquette	L 62–69	14–7 (4–4)	Bradley Center; Milwaukee, Wisconsin
Feb. 6, 2007; 7:30 p.m.		Cincinnati	W 71–70	15–7 (5–4)	Dunkin' Donuts Center (8,557); Providence, RI
Feb. 10, 2007; 6:00 p.m.		at No. 7 Pittsburgh	L 68–74	15–8 (5–5)	Petersen Events Center; Pittsburgh, PA
Feb. 15, 2007; 7:00 p.m.		at Notre Dame	L 78–81	15–9 (5–6)	Joyce Center; Notre Dame, IN
Feb. 17, 2007; 12:00 p.m.		St. John's	W 71–66	16–9 (6–6)	Dunkin' Donuts Center (10,800); Providence, RI
Feb. 20, 2007; 7:30 p.m.		No. 22 West Virginia	W 64–61	17–9 (7–6)	Dunkin' Donuts Center; Providence, RI
Feb. 24, 2007; 12:00 p.m.		Syracuse	L 67–71	17–10 (7–7)	Dunkin' Donuts Center; Providence, RI
Feb. 28, 2007; 7:00 p.m.		at South Florida	W 77–72	18–10 (8–7)	Sun Dome; Tampa, Florida
Mar. 4, 2007; 2:00 p.m.		at St. John’s	L 64–77	18–11 (8–8)	Madison Square Garden (7,481); New York, NY
Big East tournament
Mar. 7, 2007; 7:00 p.m.	(10)	vs. (7) West Virginia; First round	L 79–92	18–12	Madison Square Garden; New York, NY
NIT
Mar. 14, 2007; 8:00 p.m.		at Bradley; First round	L 78–90 ^{OT}	18–13	Carver Arena; Peoria, IL
*Non-conference game. ^{#}Rankings from AP Poll. (#) Tournament seedings in parentheses. All times are in Eastern Time.
