= 2006–07 Marquette Golden Eagles men's basketball team =

American college basketball season

2006–07 Marquette Golden Eagles men's basketball
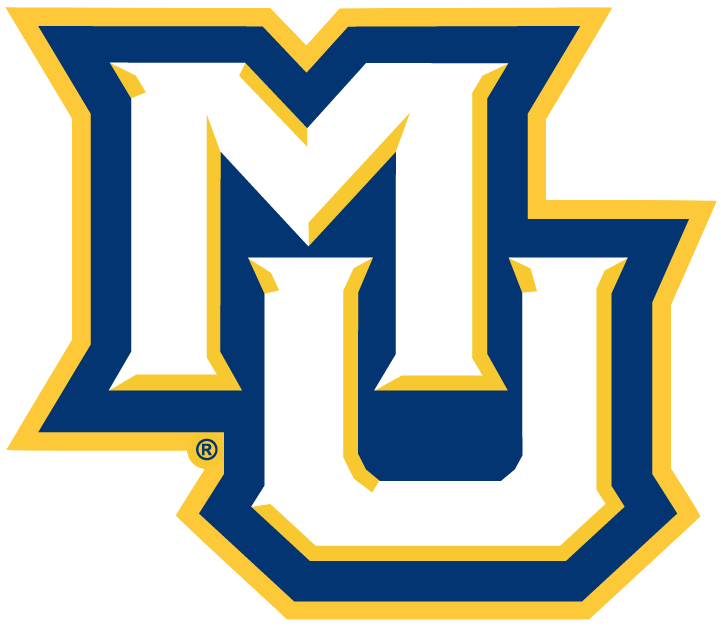

NCAA tournament, First Round
- Conference: Big East Conference

Ranking
- AP: No. 20
- Record: 24–10 (10–6 Big East)
- Head coach: Tom Crean (8th season)
- Home arena: Bradley Center

2006–07 Big East men's basketball standings
	Conf.				Overall
Team	W		L	PCT	W		L	PCT
No. 8 Georgetown †	13	–	3	.813	30	–	7	.811
No. 16 Louisville	12	–	4	.750	24	–	10	.706
No. 12 Pittsburgh	12	–	4	.750	29	–	8	.784
No. 17 Notre Dame	11	–	5	.688	24	–	8	.750
No. 20 Marquette	10	–	6	.625	24	–	10	.706
West Virginia	9	–	7	.563	27	–	9	.750
DePaul	9	–	7	.563	20	–	14	.588
Villanova	9	–	7	.563	22	–	11	.667
Providence	8	–	8	.500	18	–	13	.581
St. John's	7	–	9	.438	16	–	15	.516
Connecticut	6	–	10	.375	17	–	14	.548
*Seton Hall	4	–	12	.250	13	–	16	.448
*South Florida	3	–	13	.188	12	–	18	.400
*Rutgers	3	–	13	.188	10	–	19	.345
*Cincinnati	2	–	14	.125	11	–	19	.367
**Syracuse	0	–	6	.000	2	–	11	.154
† 2007 Big East tournament winner As of April 2, 2007; Rankings from AP Poll; *Did not qualify for 2007 Big East tournament **Syracuse had 22 regular season games and two postseason games vacated due to sanctions against the program; Syracuse′s disputed record was 10–6, 24–11.

The 2006–07 Marquette Golden Eagles men's basketball team represented Marquette University in the 2006–07 NCAA Division I men's basketball season. The Golden Eagles, led by 8th-year head coach Tom Crean, played their home games at the Bradley Center as members of the Big East Conference. They lost to Michigan State in the opening round of the NCAA tournament.

== Roster ==
2006–07 Marquette Golden Eagles men's basketball team
Players
Coaches

Pos.	#	Name	Height	Weight	Year	Previous school	Hometown
G	1	Dominic James	5 ft 11 in (1.8 m)	185 lb (84 kg)	So	Richmond	Richmond, Indiana
G	2	Maurice Acker	5 ft 8 in (1.73 m)	165 lb (75 kg)	Fr	Hillcrest	Hazel Crest, Illinois
F	5	Dan Fitzgerald	6 ft 9 in (2.06 m)	220 lb (100 kg)	Jr	Saint Thomas Academy	Saint Paul, Minnesota
G	10	David Cubillan	6 ft 0 in (1.83 m)	175 lb (79 kg)	Fr	St. Benedict's Prep	Maricaibo, Venezuela
F	12	Dwight Burke	6 ft 8 in (2.03 m)	250 lb (113 kg)	So	St. Benedict's Prep	Brooklyn, New York
F	21	Lawrence Blackledge	6 ft 8 in (2.03 m)	185 lb (84 kg)	Jr	Carbondale	Carbondale, Illinois
G	22	Jerel McNeal	6 ft 3 in (1.91 m)	200 lb (91 kg)	So	Hillcrest	Chicago, Illinois
G/F	23	Wesley Matthews	6 ft 5 in (1.96 m)	210 lb (95 kg)	So	James Madison Memorial	Madison, Wisconsin
F	32	Lazar Hayward	6 ft 6 in (1.98 m)	220 lb (100 kg)	Fr		Buffalo, New York
F	41	Ousmane Barro	6 ft 10 in (2.08 m)	235 lb (107 kg)	Jr	Chicago Julian	Dakar, Senegal
G	42	Tommy Brice	5 ft 11 in (1.8 m)	174 lb (79 kg)	Jr	Lake Park	Bloomingdale, Illinois
F	51	Jamil Lott	6 ft 7 in (2.01 m)	225 lb (102 kg)	Sr		Saint Paul, Minnesota

Head coach

- Tom Crean (Central Michigan)

Assistant coach(es)

Legend

- (C) Team captain
- (S) Suspended
- (I) Ineligible
- (W) Walk-on
- Injured
- Current redshirt

Roster

== Schedule and results ==
Date time, TV	Rank^{#}	Opponent^{#}	Result	Record	Site (attendance) city, state
Non-conference regular season
Nov 10, 2006*	No. 16	Hillsdale	W 76–66	1–0	Bradley Center; Milwaukee, Wisconsin
Nov 13, 2006*	No. 16	Idaho State	W 59–56 ^{OT}	2–0	Bradley Center; Milwaukee, Wisconsin
Nov 14, 2006*	No. 16	Detroit	W 87–45	3–0	Bradley Center; Milwaukee, Wisconsin
Nov 18, 2006*	No. 16	Eastern Michigan	W 95–62	4–0	Bradley Center; Milwaukee, Wisconsin
Nov 20, 2006*	No. 13	vs. Texas Tech; CBE Classic	W 87–72	5–0	Municipal Auditorium; Kansas City, Missouri
Nov 21, 2006*	No. 13	vs. No. 9 Duke; CBE Classic	W 73–62	6–0	Municipal Auditorium; Kansas City, Missouri
Nov 27, 2006*	No. 8	at Valparaiso	W 65–62	7–0	Athletics-Recreation Center; Valparaiso, Indiana
Dec 1, 2006*	No. 8	Northwestern State	W 83–67	8–0	Bradley Center; Milwaukee, Wisconsin
Dec 2, 2006*	No. 8	North Dakota State	L 60–64	8–1	Bradley Center; Milwaukee, Wisconsin
Dec 5, 2006*	No. 17	Delaware State	W 65–48	9–1	Bradley Center; Milwaukee, Wisconsin
Dec 9, 2006*; 2:00 p.m., ESPN	No. 17	No. 11 Wisconsin	L 66–70	9–2	Bradley Center (19,020); Milwaukee, Wisconsin
Dec 16, 2006*	No. 20	Maryland-Baltimore County	W 68–46	10–2	Bradley Center; Milwaukee, Wisconsin
Dec 19, 2006*	No. 19	Oakland	W 80–62	11–2	Bradley Center; Milwaukee, Wisconsin
Dec 22, 2006*	No. 19	Morgan State	W 77–57	12–2	Bradley Center; Milwaukee, Wisconsin
Dec 30, 2006*	No. 18	Savannah State	W 69–51	13–2	Bradley Center; Milwaukee, Wisconsin
Big East regular season
Jan 4, 2007	No. 15	at Providence	L 59–74	13–3 (0–1)	Dunkin' Donuts Center; Providence, Rhode Island
Jan 7, 2007	No. 15	Syracuse	L 58–70	13–4 (0–2)	Bradley Center; Milwaukee, Wisconsin
Jan 10, 2007		at No. 24 Connecticut	W 73–69	14–4 (1–2)	Harry A. Gampel Pavilion; Storrs, Connecticut
Jan 13, 2007		No. 21 West Virginia	W 81–63	15–4 (2–2)	Bradley Center; Milwaukee, Wisconsin
Jan 15, 2007	No. 24	at Louisville	W 74–65	16–4 (3–2)	Freedom Hall; Louisville, Kentucky
Jan 21, 2007	No. 24	at No. 6 Pittsburgh	W 77–74 ^{OT}	17–4 (4–2)	Petersen Events Center; Pittsburgh, Pennsylvania
Jan 24, 2007	No. 15	Seton Hall	W 89–76	18–4 (5–2)	Bradley Center; Milwaukee, Wisconsin
Jan 28, 2007	No. 15	at South Florida	W 70–68	19–4 (6–2)	Sun Dome; Tampa, Florida
Feb 3, 2007	No. 14	Providence	W 69–62	20–4 (7–2)	Bradley Center; Milwaukee, Wisconsin
Feb 7, 2007	No. 11	Rutgers	W 67–47	21–4 (8–2)	Bradley Center; Milwaukee, Wisconsin
Feb 10, 2007	No. 11	at No. 22 Georgetown	L 58–76	21–5 (8–3)	Verizon Center; Washington, D.C.
Feb 14, 2007	No. 12	at DePaul	L 67–72	21–6 (8–4)	Allstate Arena; Rosemont, Illinois
Feb 17, 2007	No. 12	Louisville	L 59–61	21–7 (8–5)	Bradley Center; Milwaukee, Wisconsin
Feb 19, 2007	No. 16	Villanova	W 80–67	22–7 (9–5)	Bradley Center; Milwaukee, Wisconsin
Feb 24, 2007	No. 16	at Notre Dame	L 73–85	22–8 (9–6)	Joyce Center; Notre Dame, Indiana
Mar 3, 2007	No. 20	No. 12 Pittsburgh	W 75–71	23–8 (10–6)	Bradley Center; Milwaukee, Wisconsin
Big East tournament
Mar 7, 2007*	(6) No. 18	at (11) St. John's	W 76–67	24–8	Madison Square Garden; New York, New York
Mar 8, 2007*	(6) No. 18	vs. (3) No. 13 Pittsburgh	L 79–89	24–9	Madison Square Garden; New York, New York
NCAA tournament
Mar 15, 2007*	(8 S) No. 20	vs. (9 S) Michigan State; First Round	L 49–61	24–10	Lawrence Joel Coliseum; Winston-Salem, North Carolina
*Non-conference game. ^{#}Rankings from AP Poll. (#) Tournament seedings in parentheses. S=South. All times are in Central Time.
