= 2006–07 Syracuse Orange men's basketball team =

American college basketball season

2006–07 Syracuse Orange men's basketball

NIT, Quarterfinals
- Conference: Big East Conference (1979–2013)
- Record: 2–11, 22 wins vacated (2–6 Big East)
- Head coach: Jim Boeheim
- Assistant coaches: Bernie Fine; Mike Hopkins; Rob Murphy
- Home arena: Carrier Dome

2006–07 Big East men's basketball standings
	Conf.				Overall
Team	W		L	PCT	W		L	PCT
No. 8 Georgetown †	13	–	3	.813	30	–	7	.811
No. 16 Louisville	12	–	4	.750	24	–	10	.706
No. 12 Pittsburgh	12	–	4	.750	29	–	8	.784
No. 17 Notre Dame	11	–	5	.688	24	–	8	.750
No. 20 Marquette	10	–	6	.625	24	–	10	.706
West Virginia	9	–	7	.563	27	–	9	.750
DePaul	9	–	7	.563	20	–	14	.588
Villanova	9	–	7	.563	22	–	11	.667
Providence	8	–	8	.500	18	–	13	.581
St. John's	7	–	9	.438	16	–	15	.516
Connecticut	6	–	10	.375	17	–	14	.548
*Seton Hall	4	–	12	.250	13	–	16	.448
*South Florida	3	–	13	.188	12	–	18	.400
*Rutgers	3	–	13	.188	10	–	19	.345
*Cincinnati	2	–	14	.125	11	–	19	.367
**Syracuse	0	–	6	.000	2	–	11	.154
† 2007 Big East tournament winner As of April 2, 2007; Rankings from AP Poll; *Did not qualify for 2007 Big East tournament **Syracuse had 22 regular season games and two postseason games vacated due to sanctions against the program; Syracuse′s disputed record was 10–6, 24–11.

The 2006–07 Syracuse Orange men's basketball team represented Syracuse University. The head coach was Jim Boeheim, serving for his 31st year. The team played its home games at the Carrier Dome in Syracuse, New York. The team finished with a 24–11 (10–6) record, while making it to the quarterfinal round of the NIT tournament. The team was led by its three seniors, Demetris Nichols, Darryl Watkins and Terrence Roberts. Also seeing time in the starting lineup was senior Matt Gorman, junior Josh Wright, sophomores Eric Devendorf and Andy Rautins and freshman Paul Harris.

Due to NCAA sanctions for use of ineligible players, 22 wins from this season have been vacated.

== Season recap ==
Syracuse began its 2006–07 season looking for leadership after the graduation of four-year starter Gerry McNamara. Even without McNamara, the Orange had experience across the front line including seniors Demetris Nichols, Darryl Watkins and Terrence Roberts, while junior Josh Wright and sophomore Eric Devendorf rounded out the lineup. Other key players off the bench included sharp-shooting Andy Rautins, highly touted freshman Paul Harris, Mike Jones, Arinze Onuaku and senior Matt Gorman, the only holdover from the 2003 National Championship team.

Before the season even started, the Orange was hit with the injury bug, as Onuaku had season ending knee surgery. The Orange started ranked No. 17 in the AP Top 25 Poll, and won their first seven games, although they struggled through the early part of their schedule.

Injuries struck once again, as Watkins broke his nose against UTEP, and Roberts hurt his knee versus Drexel. Meanwhile, Devendorf missed time because of the death of a friend from his hometown in Michigan. This played into their early season struggles, as Syracuse lost three games to Oklahoma State, Wichita State and Drexel.

Devendorf was replaced in the lineup by Rautins, and while Harris showed flashes of his talent on defense and rebounding, he struggled with his shot and saw his playing time decrease.

Syracuse started its Big East schedule with a loss to Pittsburgh, but wins at Marquette and versus Villanova and a narrow escape against Cincinnati. The win against the Bearcats would prove to be the calm before the storm, as Syracuse then lost to St. Johns, blew a 14-point lead at Louisville, and gave up 103 points in a loss to Notre Dame in the Carrier Dome. Seemingly a lock for the NCAA Tournament at the beginning of the season, the Orange was now a bubble-team. After winning against DePaul and then losing at Connecticut, Nichols scored a career-high 37 points in a two-point win against St. Johns.

With the team's record at 16–8 overall and 5–5 in the Big East conference, Boeheim made several adjustments in the Syracuse lineup. He sent the struggling Wright to the bench and moved Devendorf to the starting point guard position and Rautins to shooting guard.

The move paid dividends, as Rautins went on a shooting tear and helped the Orange to win five of their remaining six regular season games. One of those wins was against No. 10 Georgetown at the Carrier Dome, which many assumed stamped Syracuse's ticket to the NCAA Tournament. At season's end, Syracuse posted a 21–8 record and 10–6 in Big East play.

In the Big East Tournament, Syracuse seemed to put the cherry on the top of their NCAA bid, beating Connecticut soundly in the first round before getting knocked out by Notre Dame in the second round. However, on Selection Sunday, Syracuse fans were stunned when the Orange was not selected to the NCAA Tournament.

It was the first time that a team with 10 wins in the Big East Conference was not invited to the NCAA tournament. Selection Committee Chairman Gary Walters said some of the factors in not inviting Syracuse included playing an uneven in-conference schedule, and having a weak non-conference schedule.

Syracuse headed to the National Invitation Tournament for the first time since the 2001–02 season. It defeated South Alabama and San Diego State before losing to Clemson in the quarterfinals of the NIT.

At season's end, Nichols was selected as a First Team All Big East performer, while Devendorf received All Big East Honorable Mention. Harris was named to the Big East All Rookie team.

== Roster ==
Name	Number	Position	Height	Weight	Year	Hometown
Andy Rautins	1	G	6–5	193	Sophomore	Jamesville, NY
Paul Harris	11	G/F	6–5	228	Freshman	Niagara Falls, NY
Darryl Watkins	13	C	6–11	258	Senior	Paterson, NJ
Arinze Onuaku	21	C	6–9	258	Sophomore	Lanham, MD
Eric Devendorf	23	G	6–4	178	Sophomore	Bay City, MI
Matt Gorman	23	F/C	6–9	235	Senior	Watertown, NY
Devin Brennan-McBride	25	C	6–9	254	Freshman	London, ON
Josh Wright	30	G	6–2	175	Junior	Utica, NY
Terrence Roberts	33	G	6–9	228	Senior	Jersey City, NJ
Demetris Nichols	34	F	6–8	212	Senior	Boston
