= 2006–07 Villanova Wildcats men's basketball team =

American college basketball season

2006–07 Villanova Wildcats men's basketball

NCAA tournament, Round of 64
- Conference: Big East Conference
- Record: 22–11 (9–7 Big East)
- Head coach: Jay Wright
- Assistant coaches: Brett Gunning; Pat Chambers; Ed Pinckney
- Home arena: The Pavilion

2006–07 Big East men's basketball standings
	Conf.				Overall
Team	W		L	PCT	W		L	PCT
No. 8 Georgetown †	13	–	3	.813	30	–	7	.811
No. 16 Louisville	12	–	4	.750	24	–	10	.706
No. 12 Pittsburgh	12	–	4	.750	29	–	8	.784
No. 17 Notre Dame	11	–	5	.688	24	–	8	.750
No. 20 Marquette	10	–	6	.625	24	–	10	.706
West Virginia	9	–	7	.563	27	–	9	.750
DePaul	9	–	7	.563	20	–	14	.588
Villanova	9	–	7	.563	22	–	11	.667
Providence	8	–	8	.500	18	–	13	.581
St. John's	7	–	9	.438	16	–	15	.516
Connecticut	6	–	10	.375	17	–	14	.548
*Seton Hall	4	–	12	.250	13	–	16	.448
*South Florida	3	–	13	.188	12	–	18	.400
*Rutgers	3	–	13	.188	10	–	19	.345
*Cincinnati	2	–	14	.125	11	–	19	.367
**Syracuse	0	–	6	.000	2	–	11	.154
† 2007 Big East tournament winner As of April 2, 2007; Rankings from AP Poll; *Did not qualify for 2007 Big East tournament **Syracuse had 22 regular season games and two postseason games vacated due to sanctions against the program; Syracuse′s disputed record was 10–6, 24–11.

The 2006–07 Villanova Wildcats men's basketball team represented Villanova University in the 2006–07 college basketball season. Villanova was led by head coach Jay Wright. The Wildcats participated in the Big East Conference and played their home games at The Pavilion with some select home games at the Wachovia Center. They finished the season 22–11, 9–7 in Big East play. They received an at-large bid to the 2007 NCAA Division I men's basketball tournament, earning a 9 seed, where they lost to Kentucky in the first round.

== Class of 2006 ==
College recruiting
Name	Hometown	School	Height	Weight	Commit date
Casiem Drummond; C	Bloomfield, NJ	Bloomfield HS	6 ft 8 in (2.03 m)	225 lb (102 kg)	Jul 7, 2005
Casiem Drummond; C	Recruit ratings: Scout: Rivals:				
Andrew Ott; C	Fort Washington, PA	Germantown Academy	6 ft 10 in (2.08 m)	205 lb (93 kg)	Jun 13, 2005
Andrew Ott; C	Recruit ratings: Scout: Rivals:				
Antonio Pena; PF	Oakdale, CT	St. Thomas More School	6 ft 6 in (1.98 m)	236 lb (107 kg)	Jul 13, 2005
Antonio Pena; PF	Recruit ratings: Scout: Rivals:				
Reggie Redding; SF	Philadelphia, PA	St. Joseph's Prep School	6 ft 4 in (1.93 m)	180 lb (82 kg)	Jun 5, 2005
Reggie Redding; SF	Recruit ratings: Scout: Rivals:				
Scottie Reynolds; PG	Herndon, VA	Herndon HS	6 ft 0 in (1.83 m)	185 lb (84 kg)	May 23, 2006
Scottie Reynolds; PG	Recruit ratings: Scout: Rivals:				
Overall Recruiting Rankings: Scout – 24 Rivals – 14 ESPN

== Roster ==
Villanova Basketball; 2006–07 Roster
G/F	22	Dwayne Anderson	SO	Washington, DC (St. Thomas More)
G/F	3	Bilal Benn	SO	Philadelphia, PA (Hargrave Military Academy)
F	20	Shane Clark	SO	Philadelphia, PA (Hargrave Military Academy)
G	4	Ross Condon	SR	Springfield, VA (Potomac School)
F	33	Dante Cunningham	SO	Silver Spring, MD (Potomac)
F/C	32	Cassiem Drummond	FR	West Orange, NJ (Bloomfield Tech)
G	12	Mike Nardi	SR	Linden, NJ (St. Patrick's)
F	21	Andrew Ott	FR	Abington, PA (Germantown Academy)
F	0	Antonio Pena	FR	Brooklyn, NY (St. Thomas More)
G	15	Reggie Redding	FR	Philadelphia, PA (St. Joseph's Prep)
G	1	Scottie Reynolds	FR	Herndon, VA (Herndon)
F	50	Will Sheridan	SR	Bear, DE (Sanford School)
F	34	Curtis Sumpter	SR	Brooklyn, NY (Bishop Loughlin)
F	42	Frank Tchuisi	SO	Douala, Cameroon (St. Benedict's)

== Coaching staff ==
Jay Wright – Head coach

Brett Gunning – Associate head coach

Patrick Chambers – Assistant Coach

Ed Pinckney – Assistant Coach

== Schedule ==
Date	Opponent	rank	Location	Time	Result	Overall	Conf.
**Regular Season**
November 11, 2006	@ Northwood		West Palm Beach, FL		W 97-60	1–0	0–0
November 17, 206	College of Charleston (Paradise Jam tournament)		U.S. Virgin Islands		W 81-68	2–0	0–0
November 19, 2006	@ Xavier (Paradise Jam Tournament)		U.S. Virgin Islands		L 66-71	2-1	0–0
November 20, 2006	Iowa (Paradise Jam Tournament)		U.S. Virgin Islands		W 89-60	3-1	0–0
November 25, 2006	Navy		Villanova, PA		W 70-61	4–1	0–0
November 30, 2006	@ Stony Brook		Stony Brook, NY		W 72-44	5–1	0–0
December 2, 2006	@ Penn (Philadelphia Big 5)		Philadelphia, PA		W 99-89	6–1	0–0
December 6, 2006	@ Oklahoma		Norman, OK		W 67-51	7–1	0–0
December 9, 2006	Drexel		Villanova, PA		L 76-81	7-2	0–0
December 20, 2006	Rider		Villanova, PA		W 108-61	8-2	0–0
December 23, 2006	@ La Salle (Philadelphia Big 5)		Philadelphia, PA		W 64-51	9-2	0–0
December 30, 2006	**Temple** (Philadelphia Big 5)		Villanova, PA		W 83-65	10–2	0–0
January 3, 2007	@ **West Virginia**		Morgantown, WV		L 56-67	10-3	0–1
January 6, 2007	**DePaul**		Villanova, PA		L 65-73	10-4	0-2
January 8, 2007	@ **Georgetown**		Washington, DC		W 56-52	11-4	1–2
January 13, 2007	@ **Syracuse**		Syracuse, NY		L 64-75	11-5	1-3
January 17, 2007	**#20 Notre Dame**		Villanova, PA		W 102-87	12-5	2–3
January 20, 2007	#23 Texas		Philadelphia, PA		W 76-69	13–5	2-3
January 23, 2007	@ **Providence**		Providence, RI		W 82-73	14-5	3–3
January 27, 2007	@ **Notre Dame**		South Bend, IN		L 63-66	14-6	3–4
January 29, 2007	**#7 Pittsburgh**		Philadelphia, PA		L 59-65	14-7	3–5
February 3, 2007	**Louisville**		Philadelphia, PA		W 57-53	15-7	4–5
February 6, 2007	Saint Joseph (Philadelphia Big 5)		Villanova, PA		W 56-39	16-7	4-5
February 10, 2007	@ **Seton Hall**		East Rutherford, NJ		W 78-69	17-7	5-5
February 14, 2007	**Cincinnati**		Villanova, PA		W 64-48	18-7	6-5
February 17, 2007	**#16 Georgetown**		Philadelphia, PA		L 55-58	18-8	6–6
February 19, 2007	@ **#16 Marquette**		Milwaukee, WI		L 67-80	18-9	6–7
February 24, 2007	**Rutgers**		Villanova, PA		W 74-51	19-9	7-7
February 28, 2007	@ **Connecticut**		Storrs, CT		W 78-74	20-9	8-7
March 3, 2007	**Syracuse**		Philadelphia, PA		W 78-75	21-9	9–7
**Big East tournament**
March 7, 2007	**DePaul**		New York, NY		W 75-67	22-9	9-7
March 8, 2007	**#9 Georgetown**		New York, NY		L 57-62	22-10	9-7
**NCAA tournament**
March 16, 2007	(8) Kentucky	(9)	Chicago, IL		L 58-67	22-11	9-7
Big East regular season games in **bold**. • Philadelphia Big Five games in italics. • * represent seedings in NCAA Tournament.
