= 2006–07 Connecticut Huskies men's basketball team =

American college basketball season

2006–07 Connecticut Huskies men's basketball
- Conference: Big East Conference
- Record: 17–14 (6–10 Big East)
- Head coach: Jim Calhoun (21st season)
- Assistant coaches: George Blaney; Andre LaFleur; Tom Moore
- Home arena: Harry A. Gampel Pavilion

2006–07 Big East men's basketball standings
	Conf.				Overall
Team	W		L	PCT	W		L	PCT
No. 8 Georgetown †	13	–	3	.813	30	–	7	.811
No. 16 Louisville	12	–	4	.750	24	–	10	.706
No. 12 Pittsburgh	12	–	4	.750	29	–	8	.784
No. 17 Notre Dame	11	–	5	.688	24	–	8	.750
No. 20 Marquette	10	–	6	.625	24	–	10	.706
West Virginia	9	–	7	.563	27	–	9	.750
DePaul	9	–	7	.563	20	–	14	.588
Villanova	9	–	7	.563	22	–	11	.667
Providence	8	–	8	.500	18	–	13	.581
St. John's	7	–	9	.438	16	–	15	.516
Connecticut	6	–	10	.375	17	–	14	.548
*Seton Hall	4	–	12	.250	13	–	16	.448
*South Florida	3	–	13	.188	12	–	18	.400
*Rutgers	3	–	13	.188	10	–	19	.345
*Cincinnati	2	–	14	.125	11	–	19	.367
**Syracuse	0	–	6	.000	2	–	11	.154
† 2007 Big East tournament winner As of April 2, 2007; Rankings from AP Poll; *Did not qualify for 2007 Big East tournament **Syracuse had 22 regular season games and two postseason games vacated due to sanctions against the program; Syracuse′s disputed record was 10–6, 24–11.

The 2006–07 Connecticut Huskies men's basketball team represented the University of Connecticut in the 2006–07 collegiate men's basketball season. The Huskies completed the season with a 17–14 overall record. The Huskies were members of the Big East Conference where they finished with a 6–10 record. UConn played their home games at Harry A. Gampel Pavilion in Storrs, Connecticut and the Hartford Civic Center in Hartford, Connecticut, and they were led by twenty-first-year head coach Jim Calhoun.

The Huskies lost in the first round of the 2007 Big East Men's Basketball Tournament 78–65 to the Syracuse Orange.

== Recruiting class ==
College recruiting information
Name	Hometown	School	Height	Weight	Commit date
Jerome Dyson; SG	Andover, New Hampshire	Proctor Academy	6 ft 3 in (1.91 m)	185 lb (84 kg)	Sep 17, 2005
Jerome Dyson; SG	Recruit ratings: Scout: Rivals:				
Ben Eaves; SF	Worcester, Massachusetts	Worcester Academy	6 ft 7 in (2.01 m)	210 lb (95 kg)	Oct 24, 2005
Ben Eaves; SF	Recruit ratings: Scout: Rivals:				
Gavin Edwards; C	Gilbert, Arizona	Mesquite HS	6 ft 9 in (2.06 m)	225 lb (102 kg)	Mar 31, 2006
Gavin Edwards; C	Recruit ratings: Scout: Rivals:				
Curtis Kelly; PF	New York City, New York	Rice HS	6 ft 8 in (2.03 m)	215 lb (98 kg)	Jun 29, 2005
Curtis Kelly; PF	Recruit ratings: Scout: Rivals:				
Jonathan Mandeldove; C	Chatham, Virginia	Hargrave Military Academy	6 ft 11 in (2.11 m)	225 lb (102 kg)	Sep 18, 2005
Jonathan Mandeldove; C	Recruit ratings: Scout: Rivals:				
Stanley Robinson; PF	Birmingham, Alabama	Huffman High School-Magnet	6 ft 9 in (2.06 m)	212 lb (96 kg)	Oct 11, 2005
Stanley Robinson; PF	Recruit ratings: Scout: Rivals:				
Hasheem Thabeet; C	Houston, Texas	Cypress Community Christian	7 ft 2 in (2.18 m)	245 lb (111 kg)	Jun 2, 2006
Hasheem Thabeet; C	Recruit ratings: Scout: Rivals:				
Doug Wiggins; PG	East Hartford, Connecticut	East Hartford HS	6 ft 0 in (1.83 m)	160 lb (73 kg)	Jan 3, 2005
Doug Wiggins; PG	Recruit ratings: Scout: Rivals:				
Overall recruit ranking: Scout: 5 Rivals: 4
Note: In many cases, Scout, Rivals, 247Sports, On3, and ESPN may conflict in their listings of height and weight.; In these cases, the average was taken. ESPN grades are on a 100-point scale.; Sources: "Connecticut Commit List for 2006". Rivals.; "Men's Basketball Recruiting". Scout.; "ESPN – Connecticut Basketball Recruiting 2006". ESPN.; "Scout.com Team Recruiting Rankings". Scout.; "2006 Team Ranking". Rivals.

== Roster ==
Listed are the student athletes who are members of the 2006–2007 team.

#	Name	Position	Year
4	Jeff Adrien	Forward	So
24	Craig Austrie	Guard	So
11	Jerome Dyson	Guard	Fr
2	Ben Eaves	Forward	So
33	Gavin Edwards	Forward	Fr
35	Marty Gagne	Guard	Sr
25	Rob Garrison	Guard	So
1	Marcus Johnson	Forward	So
14	Curtis Kelly	Forward	Fr
32	Jonathan Mandeldove	Center	Fr
12	A. J. Price	Guard	So
21	Stanley Robinson	Forward	Fr
10	Ben Spencer	Guard	Jr
34	Hasheem Thabeet	Center	Fr
3	Doug Wiggins	Guard	Fr

== Schedule ==
Date time, TV	Rank^{#}	Opponent^{#}	Result	Record	Site (attendance) city, state
Exhibition
11/1/2006*	No. 18	American International	W 75–59		Harry A. Gampel Pavilion; Storrs, Connecticut
11/6/2006*	No. 18	Bryant	W 70–45		Hartford Civic Center; Hartford, Connecticut
Regular season
11/10/2006*; SNY	No. 18	Quinnipiac	W 53–46	1–0	Harry A. Gampel Pavilion (10,167); Storrs, Connecticut
11/17/2006*	No. 21	Central Arkansas; Hispanic College Fund Classic	W 88–59	2–0	Hartford Civic Center (14,557); Hartford, Connecticut
11/18/2006*; SNY	No. 21	Fairfield; Hispanic College Fund Classic	W 74–49	3–0	Hartford Civic Center (14,232); Hartford, Connecticut
11/19/2006*; ESPNU	No. 21	Ole Miss; Hispanic College Fund Classic	W 77–59	4–0	Hartford Civic Center (14,813); Hartford, Connecticut
11/26/2006*; FSN New York	No. 18	Albany	W 86–55	5–0	Harry A. Gampel Pavilion (10,167); Storrs, Connecticut
11/29/2006*; FSN New York	No. 20	Sacred Heart	W 89–46	6–0	Harry A. Gampel Pavilion (10,167); Storrs, Connecticut
12/3/2006*	No. 20	Texas Southern	W 106–55	7–0	Harry A. Gampel Pavilion (10,167); Storrs, Connecticut
12/6/2006*; SNY	No. 19	Northeastern	W 81–53	8–0	Harry A. Gampel Pavilion (10,167); Storrs, Connecticut
12/17/2006*; FSN New York	No. 14	Saint Mary's College	W 89–73	9–0	Hartford Civic Center (14,308); Hartford, Connecticut
12/20/2006*; ESPNU	No. 14	Pepperdine	W 88–66	10–0	Hartford Civic Center (15,117); Hartford, Connecticut
12/27/2006*	No. 12	Coppin State	W 84–41	11–0	Hartford Civic Center (15,351); Hartford, Connecticut
12/30/2006; ESPN2	No. 12	at West Virginia	L 71–81	11–1 (0–1)	WVU Coliseum (11,903); Morgantown, West Virginia
1/2/2007; SNY	No. 18	South Florida	W 69–50	12–1 (1–1)	Hartford Civic Center (15,174); Hartford, Connecticut
1/6/2007*; ESPN	No. 18	at No. 19 LSU; ESPN College GameDay	L 49–66	12–2	Pete Maravich Assembly Center (13,121); Baton Rouge, Louisiana
1/10/2007; SNY	No. 24	No. 8 Marquette	L 69–73	12–3 (1–2)	Harry A. Gampel Pavilion (10,167); Storrs, Connecticut
1/13/2007; MSG	No. 24	at St. John's	W 68–59	13–3 (2–2)	Madison Square Garden (12,178); New York City
1/16/2007; ESPN2		at No. 6 Pittsburgh	L 54–63	13–4 (2–3)	Petersen Events Center (12,508); Pittsburgh
1/20/2007*; CBS		Indiana	L 73–77	13–5	Hartford Civic Center (16,294); Hartford, Connecticut
1/22/2007; ESPN		at Louisville	L 54–68	13–6 (2–4)	Freedom Hall (19,876); Louisville, Kentucky
1/27/2007; FSN New York		Providence	L 72–84	13–7 (2–5)	Hartford Civic Center (16,294); Hartford, Connecticut
1/31/2007; SNY		at No. 21 DePaul	L 58–66	13–8 (2–6)	Allstate Arena (10,003); Rosemont, Illinois
2/3/2007; MSG		Rutgers	W 61–50	14–8 (3–6)	Hartford Civic Center (16,294); Hartford, Connecticut
2/5/2007; ESPN		Syracuse; Rivalry	W 67–60	15–8 (4–6)	Harry A. Gampel Pavilion (10,167); Storrs, Connecticut
2/11/2007*; CBS		at Georgia Tech	L 52–65	15–9	Georgia Dome (19,194); Atlanta
2/14/2007; MSG		Seton Hall	W 67–55	16–9 (5–6)	Harry A. Gampel Pavilion (10,167); Storrs, Connecticut
2/17/2007; ABC		at Syracuse; Rivalry	L 63–73	16–10 (5–7)	Carrier Dome (32,376); Syracuse, New York
2/21/2007; FSN New York		at Rutgers	W 65–55	17–10 (6–7)	Louis Brown Athletic Center (7,070); Piscataway, New Jersey
2/25/2007; CBS		Louisville	L 69–76	17–11 (6–8)	Hartford Civic Center (16,294); Hartford, Connecticut
2/28/2007; ESPN		Villanova	L 74–78	17–12 (6–9)	Harry A. Gampel Pavilion (10,167); Storrs, Connecticut
3/3/2007; CBS		at No. 10 Georgetown; Rivalry	L 46–59	17–13 (6–10)	Verizon Center (18,764); Washington, D.C.
Big East tournament
3/7/2007; ESPN		vs. Syracuse; First Round/Rivalry	L 65–78	17–14	Madison Square Garden (19,594); New York
*Non-conference game. ^{#}Rankings from AP Poll. (#) Tournament seedings in parentheses.
