= 2006–07 Louisville Cardinals men's basketball team =

American college basketball season

2006–07 Louisville Cardinals men's basketball

NCAA tournament, Round of 32
- Conference: Big East Conference (1979–2013)

Ranking
- Coaches: No. 20
- AP: No. 16
- Record: 24–10 (12–4 Big East)
- Head coach: Rick Pitino (6th season)
- Home arena: Freedom Hall

2006–07 Big East men's basketball standings
	Conf.				Overall
Team	W		L	PCT	W		L	PCT
No. 8 Georgetown †	13	–	3	.813	30	–	7	.811
No. 16 Louisville	12	–	4	.750	24	–	10	.706
No. 12 Pittsburgh	12	–	4	.750	29	–	8	.784
No. 17 Notre Dame	11	–	5	.688	24	–	8	.750
No. 20 Marquette	10	–	6	.625	24	–	10	.706
West Virginia	9	–	7	.563	27	–	9	.750
DePaul	9	–	7	.563	20	–	14	.588
Villanova	9	–	7	.563	22	–	11	.667
Providence	8	–	8	.500	18	–	13	.581
St. John's	7	–	9	.438	16	–	15	.516
Connecticut	6	–	10	.375	17	–	14	.548
*Seton Hall	4	–	12	.250	13	–	16	.448
*South Florida	3	–	13	.188	12	–	18	.400
*Rutgers	3	–	13	.188	10	–	19	.345
*Cincinnati	2	–	14	.125	11	–	19	.367
**Syracuse	0	–	6	.000	2	–	11	.154
† 2007 Big East tournament winner As of April 2, 2007; Rankings from AP Poll; *Did not qualify for 2007 Big East tournament **Syracuse had 22 regular season games and two postseason games vacated due to sanctions against the program; Syracuse′s disputed record was 10–6, 24–11.

The 2006–07 Louisville Cardinals men's basketball team represented the University of Louisville in the 2006–07 NCAA Division I men's basketball season. The head coach was Rick Pitino and the team finished the season with an overall record of 24–10.

== Schedule and results ==
Date time, TV	Rank^{#}	Opponent^{#}	Result	Record	High points	High rebounds	High assists	Site city, state
Non-Conference regular season
November 18, 2006*; 1:00 pm		Northwestern State	W 100–87	1–0	24 – Smith	7 – Padgett	4 – Tied	Freedom Hall; Louisville, Kentucky
November 19, 2006*; 5:00 pm		vs. Dayton	L 64–68	1–1	14 – Padgett	11 – Palacios	6 – Williams	U.S. Bank Arena; Cincinnati, Ohio
December 2, 2006*; 7:00 pm		Sacramento State	W 99–69	2–1	16 – Tied	10 – Palacios	8 – Williams	Freedom Hall; Louisville, Kentucky
December 5, 2006*; 9:30 pm		vs. No. 14 Arizona; Jimmy V Classic	L 65–72	2–2	15 – Palacios	10 – Williams	3 – Tied	Madison Square Garden; New York, New York
December 8, 2006*; 7:00 pm		Ohio; Marques Maybin Classic	L 71–74	3–2	22 – Sosa	8 – Palacios	9 – Williams	Freedom Hall; Louisville, Kentucky
December 9, 2006*; 7:05 pm		St. Joseph's; Marques Maybin Classic	W 74–64	4–2	19 – Scott	13 – Williams	5 – Williams	Freedom Hall; Louisville, Kentucky
December 10, 2006*; 6:00 pm		Bellarmine; Marques Maybin Classic	W 76–64	5–2	16 – Tied	12 – Williams	4 – Gianiny	Freedom Hall; Louisville, Kentucky
December 13, 2006*; 7:00 pm		UMass; Billy Minardi Classic	L 68–72	5–3	21 – Williams	8 – Tied	4 – Padgett	Freedom Hall; Louisville, Kentucky
December 16, 2006*; 1:30 pm		Kentucky; Rivalry Game	L 49–61	5–4	16 – Padgett	10 – Padgett	2 – Tied	Freedom Hall; Louisville, Kentucky
December 20, 2006*; 7:00 pm		Savannah State	W 71–45	6–4	20 – Palacios	8 – Palacios	3 – Tied	Freedom Hall; Louisville, Kentucky
December 23, 2006*; 2:00 pm		Miami (FL)	W 82–59	7–4	22 – Smith	12 – Smith	5 – Jenkins	Freedom Hall; Louisville, Kentucky
December 27, 2006*; 7:00 pm		Northeastern	W 61–41	8–4	16 – Smith	10 – Palacios	3 – Sosa	Freedom Hall; Louisville, Kentucky
December 28, 2006*; 7:00 pm		San Francisco	W 76–63	9–4	21 – Williams	9 – Williams	8 – Sosa	Freedom Hall; Louisville, Kentucky
December 30, 2006*; 1:00 pm		UNC Asheville	W 66–51	10–4	11 – Tied	8 – Padgett	3 – Williams	Freedom Hall; Louisville, Kentucky
Big East regular season
January 3, 2007; 6:00 pm		at No. 17 Notre Dame	L 62–78	10–5 (0–1)	18 – Williams	6 – Tied	5 – McGee	Joyce Center; South Bend, Indiana
January 10, 2007; 7:00 pm		at South Florida	W 81–55	11–5 (1–1)	17 – Williams	9 – Williams	3 – Tied	Sun Dome; Tampa, Florida
January 13, 2007; 12:00 pm		Providence	W 78–63	12–5 (2–1)	23 – Williams	12 – Williams	5 – Tied	Freedom Hall; Louisville, Kentucky
January 15, 2007; 7:00 pm		No. 24 Marquette	L 65–74	12–6 (2–2)	18 – Padgett	9 – Padgett	2 – Tied	Freedom Hall; Louisville, Kentucky
January 20, 2007; 12:00 pm		at DePaul	W 59–50	13–6 (3–2)	21 – Palacios	11 – Williams	5 – Williams	Allstate Arena; Rosemont, Illinois
January 22, 2007; 7:00 pm		UConn	W 68–54	14–6 (4–2)	19 – Padgett	11 – Padgett	2 – Tied	Freedom Hall; Louisville, Kentucky
January 27, 2007; 7:00 pm		Syracuse	W 76–71	15–6 (5–2)	19 – Sosa	9 – Padgett	3 – Tied	Freedom Hall; Louisville, Kentucky
January 31, 2007; 8:00 pm		at Cincinnati; Rivalry Game	W 69–63	16–6 (6–2)	18 – Padgett	12 – Padgett	4 – Williams	Fifth Third Arena; Cincinnati, Ohio
February 3, 2007; 12:00 pm		at Villanova	L 53–57	16–7 (6–3)	14 – Clark	7 – Padgett	3 – Tied	Wachovia Center; Philadelphia, Pennsylvania
February 7, 2007; 7:00 pm		No. 22 Georgetown	L 65–73	16–8 (6–4)	14 – Clark	9 – Padgett	3 – Tied	Freedom Hall; Louisville, Kentucky
February 10, 2007; 3:00 pm		South Florida	W 83–63	17–8 (7–4)	16 – Caracter	10 – Caracter	6 – Sosa	Freedom Hall; Louisville, Kentucky
February 12, 2007; 7:00 pm		at No. 7 Pittsburgh	W 66–53	18–8 (8–4)	16 – Padgett	6 – Tied	7 – Williams	Petersen Events Center; Pittsburgh, Pennsylvania
February 17, 2007; 9:00 pm		at No. 12 Marquette	W 61–59	19–8 (9–4)	15 – Sosa	7 – Williams	6 – Williams	Bradley Center; Milwaukee, Wisconsin
February 21, 2007; 7:00 pm	No. 20	St. John's	W 72–48	20–8 (10–4)	16 – Williams	7 – Smith	4 – Williams	Freedom Hall; Louisville, Kentucky
February 25, 2007; 12:00 pm	No. 20	at UConn	W 76–69	21–8 (11–4)	17 – Williams	7 – Tied	4 – Tied	Gampel Pavilion; Storrs, Connecticut
March 4, 2007; 12:00 pm	No. 16	Seton Hall	W 86–71	22–8 (12–4)	18 – Sosa	11 – Williams	4 – Tied	Freedom Hall; Louisville, Kentucky
Big East Tournament
March 8, 2007*; 7:00 pm, ESPN	(2) No. 12	vs. (7) West Virginia; Quarterfinals	W 82–71 ^{2OT}	23–8	21 – Williams	9 – Tied	5 – Padgett	Madison Square Garden; New York, New York
March 9, 2007*; 9:00 pm, ESPN	(2) No. 12	vs. (2) No. 13 Pittsburgh; Semifinals	L 59–65	23–9	18 – Williams	12 – Clark	9 – Williams	Madison Square Garden; New York, New York
NCAA Tournament
March 15, 2007*; 12:30 pm, CBS	(6 S) No. 16	vs. (11 S) Stanford; First Round	W 78–58	24–9	16 – Tied	5 – Jenkins	4 – Williams	Rupp Arena; Lexington, Kentucky
March 17, 2007*; 3:40 pm, CBS	(6 S) No. 16	vs. (3 S) No. 9 Texas A&M; Second Round	L 69–72	24–10	31 – Sosa	5 – Tied	1 – Tied	Rupp Arena; Lexington, Kentucky
*Non-conference game. ^{#}Rankings from AP Poll. (#) Tournament seedings in parentheses. S=South. All times are in Eastern Time.
