= 2006–07 St. John's Red Storm men's basketball team =

American college basketball season

2006–07 St. John's Red Storm men's basketball
- Conference: Big East Conference
- Record: 16–15 (7–9 Big East)
- Head coach: Norm Roberts (3rd year)
- Assistant coaches: Glenn Braica; Chris Casey; Fred Quartlebaum
- Home arena: Carnesecca Arena; Madison Square Garden

2006–07 Big East men's basketball standings
	Conf.				Overall
Team	W		L	PCT	W		L	PCT
No. 8 Georgetown †	13	–	3	.813	30	–	7	.811
No. 16 Louisville	12	–	4	.750	24	–	10	.706
No. 12 Pittsburgh	12	–	4	.750	29	–	8	.784
No. 17 Notre Dame	11	–	5	.688	24	–	8	.750
No. 20 Marquette	10	–	6	.625	24	–	10	.706
West Virginia	9	–	7	.563	27	–	9	.750
DePaul	9	–	7	.563	20	–	14	.588
Villanova	9	–	7	.563	22	–	11	.667
Providence	8	–	8	.500	18	–	13	.581
St. John's	7	–	9	.438	16	–	15	.516
Connecticut	6	–	10	.375	17	–	14	.548
*Seton Hall	4	–	12	.250	13	–	16	.448
*South Florida	3	–	13	.188	12	–	18	.400
*Rutgers	3	–	13	.188	10	–	19	.345
*Cincinnati	2	–	14	.125	11	–	19	.367
**Syracuse	0	–	6	.000	2	–	11	.154
† 2007 Big East tournament winner As of April 2, 2007; Rankings from AP Poll; *Did not qualify for 2007 Big East tournament **Syracuse had 22 regular season games and two postseason games vacated due to sanctions against the program; Syracuse′s disputed record was 10–6, 24–11.

The 2006–07 St. John's Red Storm men's basketball team represented St. John's University during the 2006–07 NCAA Division I men's basketball season. The team was coached by Norm Roberts in his third year at the school. St. John's home games are played at Carnesecca Arena and Madison Square Garden and the team is a member of the Big East Conference.

== Off season ==
=== Departures ===
Name	Number	Pos.	Height	Weight	Year	Hometown	Notes
Nygel Roach	0	G	6'3"	195	Senior	North Bergen, New Jersey	Graduated
Jermaine Maybank	1	SG	6'4"	180	RS Junior	Bronx, New York	Transferred to Kansas State
Phil Missere	15	PF	6'9"	206	Senior	Cornwall-on-Hudson, New York	Graduated
Ryan Williams	23	SF	6'5"	225	Senior	Bayside, New York	Graduated
Dexter Gray	24	PF	6'6"	220	Sophomore	Mount Vernon, New York	Transferred to Iona
Cedric Jackson		PG	6'1"	180	Sophomore	McGuire, New Jersey	Transferred to Cleveland State

=== Class of 2006 signees ===
College recruiting information
Name	Hometown	School	Height	Weight	Commit date
Derwin Kitchen; SG	Jacksonville, FL	Raines High School	6 ft 4 in (1.93 m)	180 lb (82 kg)	Apr 7, 2006
Derwin Kitchen; SG	Recruit ratings: Scout: Rivals: 247Sports:				
Qa'rraan Calhoun; PF	North Bridgton, ME	Bridgton Academy	6 ft 7 in (2.01 m)	225 lb (102 kg)	May 10, 2005
Qa'rraan Calhoun; PF	Recruit ratings: Scout: Rivals: 247Sports:				
Rob Thomas; PF	Harlem, NY	South Kent School	6 ft 6 in (1.98 m)	247 lb (112 kg)	Feb 14, 2006
Rob Thomas; PF	Recruit ratings: Scout: Rivals: 247Sports:				
Larry Wright; SG	Saginaw, MI	Saginaw High School	6 ft 2 in (1.88 m)	172 lb (78 kg)	Feb 9, 2006
Larry Wright; SG	Recruit ratings: Scout: Rivals: 247Sports:				
Avery Patterson; SG	Kannapolis, NC	Iowa Western Community College	6 ft 4 in (1.93 m)	204 lb (93 kg)	Apr 11, 2006
Avery Patterson; SG	Recruit ratings: No ratings found				
Overall recruit ranking:
Note: In many cases, Scout, Rivals, 247Sports, On3, and ESPN may conflict in their listings of height and weight.; In these cases, the average was taken. ESPN grades are on a 100-point scale.; Sources: "2006 Team Ranking". Rivals.

== Roster ==
2005–06 St. John's Red Storm men's basketball team
Players
Coaches

Pos.	#	Name	Height	Weight	Year	Previous school	Hometown
F	1	Qa'rraan Calhoun	6 ft 7 in (2.01 m)	225 lb (102 kg)	Fr	Bridgton Academy	Hazlet, NJ
F	2	Anthony Mason Jr.	6 ft 7 in (2.01 m)	213 lb (97 kg)	So	Failey	Memphis, TN
G	3	Daryll Hill	6 ft 3 in (1.91 m)	170 lb (77 kg)	RS Sr	Milford Academy	Bayside, NY
G	4	Eugene Lawrence	6 ft 1 in (1.85 m)	210 lb (95 kg)	Jr	Abraham Lincoln	Brooklyn, NY
G	5	Larry Wright	6 ft 2 in (1.88 m)	172 lb (78 kg)	Fr	Saginaw	Saginaw, MI
G	10	Devin Mayo (W)	6 ft 0 in (1.83 m)	158 lb (72 kg)	Sr	Clinton Christian	Upper Marlboro, MD
C	11	Tomas Jasiulionis	6 ft 11 in (2.11 m)	249 lb (113 kg)	So	Trinity Episcopal	Utena, Lithuania
G	15	Avery Patterson	6 ft 4 in (1.93 m)	204 lb (93 kg)	Jr	A.L. Brown/Iowa Western	Kannapolis, NC
G	22	Ricky Torres	6 ft 4 in (1.93 m)	200 lb (91 kg)	So	St. Raymond's	New York, NY
G	23	Derwin Kitchen (I)	6 ft 4 in (1.93 m)	205 lb (93 kg)	Fr	Raines	Jacksonville, FL
G	30	Liam Biesty (W)	6 ft 0 in (1.83 m)	185 lb (84 kg)	Jr	Poly Prep	Brooklyn, NY
F/C	34	Lamont Hamilton	6 ft 10 in (2.08 m)	225 lb (102 kg)	Sr	Bridgton Academy	Brooklyn, NY
F	33	Otoja Abit (W)	6 ft 6 in (1.98 m)	195 lb (88 kg)	Jr	Archbishop Molloy	Woodside, NY
F	40	Aaron Spears	6 ft 9 in (2.06 m)	250 lb (113 kg)	Sr	Dunbar/Illinois/Highland	Chicago, IL
F	55	Rob Thomas (redshirt)	6 ft 6 in (1.98 m)	247 lb (112 kg)	Fr	South Kent	Harlem, NY

Head coach

- Norm Roberts (Queens College)

Assistant coach(es)

- Glenn Braica
- Chris Casey
- Fred Quartlebaum

Legend

- (C) Team captain
- (S) Suspended
- (I) Ineligible
- (W) Walk-on
- Injured
- Current redshirt

== Schedule and results ==
Date time, TV	Rank^{#}	Opponent^{#}	Result	Record	Site (attendance) city, state
Exhibition
11/04/06*; 2:00pm		St. Thomas Aquinas	W 82–64		Carnesecca Arena (3,779); Queens, NY
Regular Season
11/10/06*; 8:00pm		North Florida; Coaches vs. Cancer Classic Opening Round	W 74–53	1–0	Carnesecca Arena (4,035); Queens, NY
11/11/06*; 8:00pm		Navy; Coaches vs. Cancer Classic Opening Round	W 72–49	2–0	Carnesecca Arena (4,258); Queens, NY
11/16/06*; 7:00pm		vs. Maryland; Coaches vs. Cancer Classic Semifinal	L 60–92	2–1	Madison Square Garden (N/A); New York, NY
11/17/06*; 7:00pm		vs. No. 19 Texas; Coaches vs. Cancer Classic Consolation	L 76–77	2–2	Madison Square Garden (N/A); New York, NY
11/25/06*; 7:30pm		Illinois State	L 65–78	2–3	Carnesecca Arena (4,038); Queens, NY
11/28/06*; 7:30pm		LIU Brooklyn	W 64–46	3–3	Carnesecca Arena (3,840); Queens, NY
12/01/06*; 7:30pm		UMBC	W 78–57	4–3	Carnesecca Arena (3,994); Queens, NY
12/05/06*; 7:30pm		St. Francis (NY)	W 59–42	5–3	Carnesecca Arena (3,752); Queens, NY
12/09/06*; 9:00pm		at Niagara	W 86–64	6–3	Gallagher Center (1,869); Niagara Falls, NY
12/21/06*; 7:30pm		N.J.I.T.	W 68–50	7–3	Carnesecca Arena (4,165); Queens, NY
12/23/06*; 7:30pm		Columbia	W 76–70	8–3	Carnesecca Arena (4,368); Queens, NY
12/28/06*; 8:30pm		vs. Boston University; Aeropostale Holiday Festival Opening Round	W 45–44 ^{OT}	9–3	Madison Square Garden (10,613); New York, NY
12/29/06*; 8:30pm		vs. Hofstra; Aeropostale Holiday Festival Championship	L 51–63	9–4	Madison Square Garden (9,931); New York, NY
01/03/07; 7:30pm		DePaul	W 64–53	10–4 (1–0)	Carnesecca Arena (5,055); Queens, NY
01/06/07; 4:00pm		at No. 25 West Virginia	L 46–73	10–5 (1–1)	WVU Coliseum (11,083); Morgantown, WV
01/11/07; 7:00pm		at Seton Hall	L 63–79	10–6 (1–2)	Izod Center (6,528); East Rutherford, NJ
01/13/07; 7:30pm		No. 24 Connecticut	L 59–68	10–7 (1–3)	Madison Square Garden (12,178); New York, NY
01/16/07; 8:30pm		at DePaul	L 63–71	10–8 (1–4)	Allstate Arena (8,011); Rosemont, IL
01/21/07; 2:00pm		Syracuse	W 64–60	11–8 (2–4)	Madison Square Garden (N/A); New York, NY
01/23/07; 7:30pm		No. 22 Notre Dame	W 71–68	12–8 (3–4)	Madison Square Garden (6,873); New York, NY
01/27/07; 4:00pm		at No. 9 Pittsburgh	L 46–72	12–9 (3–5)	Petersen Events Center (12,058); Pittsburgh, PA
02/01/07; 7:00pm		Georgetown	L 48–72	12–10 (3–6)	Madison Square Garden (7,797); New York, NY
02/04/07; 12:00pm		at Cincinnati	W 73–64	13–10 (4–6)	Fifth Third Arena (7,902); Cincinnati, OH
02/07/07; 7:30pm		South Florida	W 66–62	14–10 (5–6)	Carnesecca Arenna (4,597); Queens, NY
02/11/07; 2:00pm		at Syracuse	L 74–76	14–11 (5–7)	Carrier Dome (24,106); Syracuse, NY
02/15/07; 7:30pm		Rutgers	W 60–55	15–11 (6–7)	Carnesecca Arena (5,503); Queens, NY
02/17/07; 12:00pm		at Providence	L 66–71	15–12 (6–8)	Dunkin Donuts Center (10,800); Providence, RI
02/21/07; 7:00pm		at No. 20 Louisville	L 48–72	15–13 (6–9)	Freedom Hall (19,634); Louisville, KY
02/25/07*; 2:00pm		No. 18 Duke	L 50–67	15–14 (6–9)	Madison Square Garden (17,283); New York, NY
03/04/07; 2:00pm		Providence	W 77–64	16–14 (7–9)	Madison Square Garden (7,481); New York, NY
Big East tournament
03/07/07; 9:00pm	(11)	vs. (6) No. 18 Marquette; First round	L 67–76	16–15 (7–9)	Madison Square Garden (19,594); New York, NY
*Non-conference game. ^{#}Rankings from AP Poll. (#) Tournament seedings in parentheses.
