= 2006–07 Cincinnati Bearcats men's basketball team =

American college basketball season

2006–07 Cincinnati Bearcats men's basketball
- Conference: Big East Conference (1979–2013)
- Record: 11-19 (2-14 Big East)
- Head coach: Mick Cronin (1st season)
- Assistant coaches: Larry Davis (1st season); Chris Goggin (1st season); Tony Stubblefield (1st season)
- Home arena: Fifth Third Arena

2006–07 Big East men's basketball standings
	Conf.				Overall
Team	W		L	PCT	W		L	PCT
No. 8 Georgetown †	13	–	3	.813	30	–	7	.811
No. 16 Louisville	12	–	4	.750	24	–	10	.706
No. 12 Pittsburgh	12	–	4	.750	29	–	8	.784
No. 17 Notre Dame	11	–	5	.688	24	–	8	.750
No. 20 Marquette	10	–	6	.625	24	–	10	.706
West Virginia	9	–	7	.563	27	–	9	.750
DePaul	9	–	7	.563	20	–	14	.588
Villanova	9	–	7	.563	22	–	11	.667
Providence	8	–	8	.500	18	–	13	.581
St. John's	7	–	9	.438	16	–	15	.516
Connecticut	6	–	10	.375	17	–	14	.548
*Seton Hall	4	–	12	.250	13	–	16	.448
*South Florida	3	–	13	.188	12	–	18	.400
*Rutgers	3	–	13	.188	10	–	19	.345
*Cincinnati	2	–	14	.125	11	–	19	.367
**Syracuse	0	–	6	.000	2	–	11	.154
† 2007 Big East tournament winner As of April 2, 2007; Rankings from AP Poll; *Did not qualify for 2007 Big East tournament **Syracuse had 22 regular season games and two postseason games vacated due to sanctions against the program; Syracuse′s disputed record was 10–6, 24–11.

The 2006–07 Cincinnati Bearcats men's basketball team represented the University of Cincinnati during the 2006–07 NCAA Division I men's basketball season. The team played its home games in Cincinnati, Ohio, at the Fifth Third Arena, which has a capacity of 13,176. The Bearcats are members of the Big East Conference and were led by first-year head coach Mick Cronin. The Bearcats finished the season 11–19, 2–14 in Big East play.

== Offseason ==
=== Departures ===
Name	Number	Pos.	Height	Weight	Year	Hometown	Notes
DeAndre Coleman	1	F	6'7"	235	Freshman	Stone Mountain, Georgia	Transferred to South Alabama
Chadd Moore	1	G	6'2"	175	Senior	Huntsville, Alabama	Graduated
Devan Downey	2	G	5'10"	175	Freshman	Chester, South Carolina	Transferred to South Carolina
Domonic Tilford	3	G	5'11"	170	Freshman	Louisville, Kentucky	Transferred to South Alabama
Jihad Muhammad	13	G	5'11"	175	Senior	Plainfield, New Jersey	Graduated
Eric Hicks	14	F	6'7"	245	Senior	Greensboro, North Carolina	Graduated
James White	21	F	6'7"	200	Senior	Washington, D.C.	Graduated
Armein Kirkland	33	G	6'8"	205	Senior	Tyler, Texas	Graduated
Erick Murray	51	F	6'5"	230	Junior	Westerville, Ohio	Walk–on; Dismissed from team (mid–season)

=== Incoming transfers ===
Name	Pos.	Height	Weight	Year	Hometown	Notes
Marvin Gentry	G	6'3"	180	Junior	Fort Worth, TX	Junior college transferred from McLennan CC
Timmy Crowell	G	6'2"	170	Junior	Albuquerque, NM	Junior college transferred from Midland College
Marcus Sikes	F	6'8"	230	Junior	Richmond, VA	Junior college transferred from Mt. San Jacinto College
Mike Williams	F	6'7"	240	Junior	Camden, AL	Transferred from Texas. Williams will sit out the 2006–07 season. Will have two years of remaining eligibility.
Jamual Warren	G	6'2"	195	Junior	Springfield, MA	Junior college transferred from Globe Institute of Technology
Adam Hrycaniuk	C	6'10"	230	Junior	Mysliborz, Poland	Junior college transferred from Trinity Valley CC. Hrycaniuk will sit out the 2006–07 season. Will have one year of remaining eligibility.
John Williamson	F	6'6"	225	Junior	Columbus, OH	Junior college transferred from Cincinnati State

=== Recruiting class of 2006 ===
College recruiting
Name	Hometown	School	Height	Weight	Commit date
Deonta Vaughn; PG	Indianapolis, Indiana	Harmony Community School	5 ft 11 in (1.80 m)	200 lb (91 kg)	Apr 20, 2006
Deonta Vaughn; PG	Recruit ratings: Rivals: 247Sports:				
Overall recruit ranking:
Note: In many cases, Scout, Rivals, 247Sports, On3, and ESPN may conflict in their listings of height and weight.; In these cases, the average was taken. ESPN grades are on a 100-point scale.; Sources: "2006 Cincinnati Basketball Commits". ESPN.; "2006 Team Ranking". Rivals.

=== Recruiting class of 2007 ===
College recruiting (2007)
Name	Hometown	School	Height	Weight	Commit date
Larry Davis; SG	Houston, Texas	Alief Hastings High School	6 ft 3 in (1.91 m)	190 lb (86 kg)	Aug 8, 2006
Larry Davis; SG	Recruit ratings: 247Sports: (91)				
Darnell Wilks; PF	Nashville, Tennessee	Pioneer Christian Academy	6 ft 8 in (2.03 m)	205 lb (93 kg)	Nov 12, 2006
Darnell Wilks; PF	Recruit ratings: 247Sports: (93)				
Kenny Belton; PF	Salem, Virginia	Dudley High School (NC)	6 ft 7 in (2.01 m)	225 lb (102 kg)	Nov 17, 2006
Kenny Belton; PF	Recruit ratings: 247Sports: (92)				
Alvin Mitchell; SF	Fort Lauderdale, Florida	Cardinal Gibbons High School	6 ft 5 in (1.96 m)	205 lb (93 kg)	Mar 7, 2007
Alvin Mitchell; SF	Recruit ratings: 247Sports: (78)				
Overall recruit ranking:
Note: In many cases, Scout, Rivals, 247Sports, On3, and ESPN may conflict in their listings of height and weight.; In these cases, the average was taken. ESPN grades are on a 100-point scale.; Sources: "2007 Cincinnati Basketball Commits". ESPN.; "2007 Team Ranking". Rivals.

== Roster ==
2006–07 Cincinnati Bearcats men's basketball team
Players
Coaches

Pos.	#	Name	Height	Weight	Year	Previous school	Hometown
G	1	Marvin Gentry	6 ft 3 in (1.91 m)	180 lb (82 kg)	Jr	McLennan CC	Fort Worth, Texas
G	3	Timmy Cromwell	6 ft 2 in (1.88 m)	170 lb (77 kg)	Jr	Midland College	Albuquerque, New Mexico
G	5	Deonta Vaughn	6 ft 1 in (1.85 m)	190 lb (86 kg)	Fr	Harmony Community School	Indianapolis, Indiana
F	10	Marcus Sikes	6 ft 8 in (2.03 m)	230 lb (104 kg)	Jr	Mt. San Jacinto CC	Richmond, Virginia
F	11	Connor Barwin (W)	6 ft 4 in (1.93 m)	240 lb (109 kg)	So	University of Detroit Jesuit High School	Southfield, Michigan
G	20	Branden Miller (W)	6 ft 4 in (1.93 m)	210 lb (95 kg)	So	Indian Hill High School	Cincinnati, Ohio
F	21	Mike Williams (redshirt)	6 ft 7 in (2.01 m)	240 lb (109 kg)	Jr	Texas	Camden, Alabama
F	23	Ronald Allen	6 ft 9 in (2.06 m)	225 lb (102 kg)	Sr	Xavier University of Louisiana	Los Angeles, California
G	25	Walter Lewis (W)	6 ft 2 in (1.88 m)	190 lb (86 kg)	Jr	Prince George High School	Prince George, Virginia
F	30	Cedric McGowan (C)	6 ft 6 in (1.98 m)	230 lb (104 kg)	Sr	Kilgore College	Miami, Florida
G	33	Jamual Warren	6 ft 2 in (1.88 m)	195 lb (88 kg)	Jr	Globe Institute of Technology	Springfield, Massachusetts
C	34	Adam Hrycaniuk (redshirt)	6 ft 10 in (2.08 m)	230 lb (104 kg)	Jr	Trinity Valley CC	Mysliborz, Poland
F	45	John Williamson	6 ft 6 in (1.98 m)	225 lb (102 kg)	Jr	Cincinnati State	Columbus, Ohio

Head coach

- Mick Cronin (Cincinnati)

Assistant coach(es)

- Chris Goggin (Cincinnati)
- Larry Davis (Asbury)
- Tony Stubblefield (Omaha)

Legend

- (C) Team captain
- (S) Suspended
- (I) Ineligible
- (W) Walk-on
- Injured
- Current redshirt

Roster
Last update: 8 Jun 2020

=== Depth chart ===
Pos.	Starting 5	Bench 1	Bench 2
C	Marcus Sikes	Ronald Allen
PF	John Williamson	Connor Barwin
SF	Cedric McGowan	Branden Miller
SG	Jamual Warren	Marvin Gentry
PG	Deonta Vaughn	Timmy Cromwell	Walter Lewis

== Schedule and results ==
Date time, TV	Rank^{#}	Opponent^{#}	Result	Record	Site (attendance) city, state
Exhibition
November 1, 2006*; 7:00pm		Northern Kentucky	W 87–41		Fifth Third Arena; Cincinnati, OH
November 4, 2006*; 2:00pm		Ottawa	W 81–59		Fifth Third Arena; Cincinnati, OH
Regular Season
November 10, 2006*; 7:00pm		Howard; Jim Thorpe Association Classic	W 70–39	1–0	Fifth Third Arena (7,608); Cincinnati, OH
November 11, 2006*; 7:00pm		Tennessee-Martin; Jim Thorpe Association Classic	W 67–49	2–0	Fifth Third Arena (7,513); Cincinnati, OH
November 12, 2006*; 7:00pm		High Point; Jim Thorpe Association Classic	W 63–51	3–0	Fifth Third Arena (7,239); Cincinnati, OH
November 21, 2006*; 7:00pm		Wofford	L 90–91	3–1	Fifth Third Arena (8,785); Cincinnati, OH
November 25, 2006*; 6:00pm		Central Michigan	W 60–50	4–1	Fifth Third Arena (7,589); Cincinnati, OH
November 29, 2006*; 8:00pm		Oakland	W 68–61	5–1	Fifth Third Arena (7,351); Cincinnati, OH
December 2, 2006*; 4:00pm		UAB	L 57–59	5–2	Fifth Third Arena (8,099); Cincinnati, OH
December 9, 2006*; 4:00pm		vs. Temple; Lenape Trail Classic	W 80–71	6–2	Boardwalk Hall (4,307); Atlantic City, NJ
December 13, 2006*; 7:00pm		Xavier; Crosstown Shootout	W 67–57	7–2	Fifth Third Arena (13,176); Cincinnati, OH
December 23, 2006*; 3:45pm		vs. No. 4 Ohio State; John Wooden Tradition	L 50–72	7–3	Conseco Fieldhouse (18,356); Indianapolis, IN
December 23, 2006*; 12:00pm		North Carolina State	W 80–71	8–3	Fifth Third Arena (9,549); Cincinnati, OH
December 27, 2006*; 7:00pm		Miami (OH)	W 60–52	9–3	US Bank Arena (9,256); Cincinnati, OH
December 30, 2006*; 6:00pm		vs. Ohio	L 66–79	9–4	Quicken Loans Arena (3,437); Cleveland, OH
January 4, 2007*; 9:00pm		at No. 22 Memphis; Rivalry	L 55–88	9–5	FedEx Forum (16,223); Memphis, TN
Big East Regular Season
January 7, 2007; 2:00pm		Rutgers	L 42–54	9–6 (0–1)	Fifth Third Arena (8,212); Cincinnati, OH
January 14, 2007; 2:00pm		at South Florida	L 59–74	9–7 (0–2)	USF Sun Dome (3,449); Tampa, FL
January 17, 2007; 7:00pm		at Syracuse	L 76–77	9–8 (0–3)	Carrier Dome (22,248); Syracuse, NY
January 20, 2007; 12:00pm		at West Virginia	W 96–83 ^{OT}	10–8 (1–3)	Fifth Third Arena (9,390); Cincinnati, OH
January 24, 2007; 8:00pm		No. 9 Pittsburgh	L 51–67	10–9 (1–4)	Fifth Third Arena (9,196); Cincinnati, OH
January 27, 2007; 12:00pm		at Georgetown	L 67–82	10–10 (1–5)	Verizon Center (13,106); Washington, D.C.
January 31, 2007; 8:00pm		Louisville; Rivalry	L 53–69	10–11 (1–6)	Fifth Third Arena (10,881); Cincinnati, OH
February 4, 2007; 12:00pm		St. John's	L 64–73	10–12 (1–7)	Fifth Third Arena (7,902); Cincinnati, OH
February 6, 2007; 7:30pm		at Providence	L 70–71	10–13 (1–8)	Dunkin' Donuts Center (8,557); Providence, RI
February 10, 2007; 4:00pm		at Rutgers	L 69–73	10–14 (1–9)	the RAC (7,104); Piscataway, NJ
February 14, 2007; 9:00pm		at Villanova	L 48–64	10–15 (1–10)	The Pavilion (6,500); Villanova, PA
February 18, 2007; 2:00pm		Notre Dame	L 64–76	10–16 (1–11)	Fifth Third Arena (11,038); Cincinnati, OH
February 21, 2007; 7:00pm		No. 12 Georgetown	L 65–75	10–17 (1–12)	Fifth Third Arena (8,163); Cincinnati, OH
February 24, 2007; 12:00pm		at DePaul	L 45–58	10–18 (1–13)	Allstate Arena (10,651); Rosemont, IL
February 28, 2007; 7:00pm		Seton Hall	W 70–67 ^{OT}	11–18 (2–13)	Fifth Third Arena (8,019); Cincinnati, OH
March 3, 2007; 4:00pm		at West Virginia	L 65–79	11–19 (2–14)	WVU Coliseum (11,968); Morgantown, WV
*Non-conference game. ^{#}Rankings from AP Poll. (#) Tournament seedings in parentheses. All times are in Eastern Time.
