= Colin Falls =

American basketball player

Colin Falls (born June 9, 1985) is an American basketball player who spent the 2007–08 season with Orlandina Basket of Italy. A 6-foot-5-inch (196 cm) shooting guard born in Park Ridge, Illinois, Falls starred at Loyola Academy in Wilmette, Illinois and played four seasons for the University of Notre Dame, where he became the first player in school history to make more than 100 three-point field goals in a single season.
