= Matt Gorman =

American basketball player (born 1984)

Personal information
- Born: May 1, 1984 (age 42) Georgetown, South Carolina, U.S.
- Listed height: 6 ft 9 in (2.06 m)
- Listed weight: 237 lb (108 kg)

Career information
- High school: Watertown (Watertown, New York)
- College: Syracuse (2002–2007)
- NBA draft: 2007: undrafted
- Playing career: 2007–2012
- Position: Forward

Matt Gorman (born May 1, 1984) is a former professional basketball player who last played for the Scranton/Wilkes-Barre Steamers. He played college basketball for Syracuse University during their first national championship in 2003. He also played three years of professional basketball in Europe. Matt's uncle is Steve Gorman, drummer for The Black Crowes rock band.

== High school ==
In high school, he started 66 of 66 games while at Watertown High School (Watertown, N.Y.). In three varsity seasons at Watertown he compiled career averages of 17 ppg., 10 rpg., 6 bpg., and shot 51 percent from the field and 78 percent from the foul line. As a senior in 2001–02, averaged 21.0 ppg., 10.0 rpg., 5.0 bpg. and shot 60 percent from the field, while helping lead Watertown to a 22–1 record and a No. 8 state ranking. His single game highs were 21 points, 12 rebounds and 10 blocked shots

He was ranked 100th among the 2002 Senior Class by Hoop Scoop and 109th by All-Star Sports and was named All-Central New York first team.

== Team USA ==
Gorman was named as one of 16 finalists for the 2002 USA Basketball Men's Junior World Championship Qualifying Team on June 2, 2002. He also participated in the 2001 USA Basketball Men's Youth Development Festival for the silver medalist East Team, averaging 4.2 ppg., 3.0 rpg. and 1.0 bpg.

== College career ==
As a freshman, Gorman was part of a class that included Gerry McNamara and Carmelo Anthony. Still, Gorman was used sparingly in his freshman season, playing in just nine games while averaging 2.3 points and 2.1 rebounds in those games. Gorman didn't play much more in his sophomore year, appearing in seven games. He red-shirted in his third year at Syracuse. In his fourth year, Gorman played about 10 minutes a game as a backup forward and center, playing in 29 games and averaging 2.9 points and 1.6 rebounds.

In his final year at Syracuse, Gorman continued to play a major bench role. He set career highs in points (2.9) and field goal percentage (43%), while also displaying a good touch from long range (46%). Gorman also started five games early on in the year due to injuries to Darryl Watkins and Terrence Roberts.

Overall, Gorman played 75 games spanning from 2002 to 2007, which included five starts. He had career averages of 2.6 points and 1.9 rebounds per game.

== Professional career ==
Gorman signed with the Neptune Cork for the 2007–08 season. He averaged nearly 24 points and 12 rebounds, helping the Cork to the league semifinals.

For the 2008–09 season, Gorman played with the Sheffield (England) Sharks. He was named an All-Star in the British League.

Gorman returned to the Sharks for the 2009–10 season.

In January 2012, Gorman joined the Scranton/Wilkes-Barre Steamers of the Premiere Basketball League for their inaugural season.
