= 2007 Big East men's basketball tournament =

- 2007 Tournament logo
- Classification: Division I
- Season: 2006–07
- Teams: 12
- Site: Madison Square Garden; New York City
- Champions: Georgetown (7th title)
- Winning coach: John Thompson III (1st title)
- MVP: Jeff Green (Georgetown)

2006–07 Big East men's basketball standings
	Conf.				Overall
Team	W		L	PCT	W		L	PCT
No. 8 Georgetown †	13	–	3	.813	30	–	7	.811
No. 16 Louisville	12	–	4	.750	24	–	10	.706
No. 12 Pittsburgh	12	–	4	.750	29	–	8	.784
No. 17 Notre Dame	11	–	5	.688	24	–	8	.750
No. 20 Marquette	10	–	6	.625	24	–	10	.706
West Virginia	9	–	7	.563	27	–	9	.750
DePaul	9	–	7	.563	20	–	14	.588
Villanova	9	–	7	.563	22	–	11	.667
Providence	8	–	8	.500	18	–	13	.581
St. John's	7	–	9	.438	16	–	15	.516
Connecticut	6	–	10	.375	17	–	14	.548
*Seton Hall	4	–	12	.250	13	–	16	.448
*South Florida	3	–	13	.188	12	–	18	.400
*Rutgers	3	–	13	.188	10	–	19	.345
*Cincinnati	2	–	14	.125	11	–	19	.367
**Syracuse	0	–	6	.000	2	–	11	.154
† 2007 Big East tournament winner As of April 2, 2007; Rankings from AP Poll; *Did not qualify for 2007 Big East tournament **Syracuse had 22 regular season games and two postseason games vacated due to sanctions against the program; Syracuse′s disputed record was 10–6, 24–11.

The 2007 Big East Men's Basketball Championship was played from March 7 to March 10, 2007. The tournament took place at Madison Square Garden in New York City and was sponsored by Aéropostale. The Georgetown Hoyas won the tournament for the first time since 1989 and the seventh time overall, and were awarded an automatic bid to the 2007 NCAA Division I men's basketball tournament. Jeff Green of Georgetown was given the Dave Gavitt Trophy, awarded to the tournament's most outstanding player.

== Bracket ==
First round
8	DePaul	67
9	Villanova	75
5	Syracuse	78
12	Connecticut	65
6	#18 Marquette	76
11	St. John's	67
7	West Virginia	92
10	Providence	79

Quarterfinals
1	#9 Georgetown	62
9	Villanova	57
4	#20 Notre Dame	89
5	Syracuse	83
3	#13 Pittsburgh	89
6	#18 Marquette	79
2	#12 Louisville	82
7	West Virginia	71

Semifinals
1	#9 Georgetown	84
4	#20 Notre Dame	82
3	#13 Pittsburgh	65
2	#12 Louisville	59

Championship game
1	#9 Georgetown	65
3	#13 Pittsburgh	42

Only the teams with the 12 best records during the regular season qualified for the tournament. The thirteenth through sixteenth finishers (Seton Hall, South Florida, Rutgers, and Cincinnati) did not take part.

== Games ==
- 1st round: Wednesday, March 7

Noon

Team	1	2	Total
(9) Villanova	28	47	75
(8) DePaul	26	41	67

2PM

Team	1	2	Total
(12) Connecticut	38	27	65
(5) Syracuse	36	42	78

7PM

Team	1	2	Total
(10) Providence	32	47	79
(7) West Virginia	40	52	92

9PM

Team	1	2	Total
(11) St. John's	28	39	67
(6) Marquette	35	41	76

- Quarterfinals: Thursday, March 8

Noon

Team	1	2	Total
(9) Villanova	18	39	57
(1) Georgetown	37	25	62

2 PM

Team	1	2	Total
(5) Syracuse	34	49	83
(4) Notre Dame	32	57	89

7 PM

Team	1	2	OT	2OT	Total
(7) West Virginia	27	31	8	5	71
(2) Louisville	35	23	8	16	82

9 PM

Team	1	2	Total
(6) Marquette	37	42	79
(3) Pittsburgh	40	49	89

- Semifinals: Friday, March 9

7 PM

Team	1	2	Total
(4) Notre Dame	46	36	82
(1) Georgetown	44	40	84

9 PM

Team	1	2	Total
(3) Pittsburgh	26	39	65
(2) Louisville	37	22	59

- Finals: Saturday, March 10

9 PM

Team	1	2	Total
(1) Georgetown	32	33	65
(3) Pittsburgh	17	25	42

== Championship game ==
On March 10, Georgetown defeated Pittsburgh, 65–42. The Panthers shot just 26.2 percent from the field in the loss. After Pittsburgh cut the lead to 13–11 with 9:04 remaining, Georgetown went on a huge run and led 28–13 with 2:58 left. The game was not close again. Jeff Green led all scorers with 21 points, while Roy Hibbert had 18. Hibbert also added eleven rebounds.

Georgetown and Pittsburgh had previously split their two regular season meetings, each winning at home. It was the Hoyas first conference tournament title since 1989 when Alonzo Mourning and Charles Smith led the way. Pittsburgh was in the championship game for the sixth time in seven years, but set a record for fewest points in a Big East final. Sam Young led the team with a meager 10 points. Pittsburgh's Aaron Gray had a season-low 3 points, going 1-of-13 from the floor.

== Awards ==
Dave Gavitt Trophy (Most Outstanding Player): Jeff Green, Georgetown

All-Tournament Team

- Roy Hibbert, Georgetown
- DaJuan Summers, Georgetown
- Terrence Williams, Louisville
- Russel Carter, Notre Dame
- Antonio Graves, Pittsburgh
