= Herbert Hill (basketball) =

American basketball player (born 1984)

Personal information
- Born: October 1, 1984 (age 42) Ulm, Germany
- Listed height: 6 ft 10 in (2.08 m)
- Listed weight: 240 lb (109 kg)

Career information
- High school: Kinston (Kinston, North Carolina)
- College: Providence (2003–2007)
- NBA draft: 2007: 2nd round, 55th overall pick
- Drafted by: Utah Jazz
- Playing career: 2009–2018
- Position: Power forward / center

Career history
- 2009: Bakersfield Jam
- 2009: Tulsa 66ers
- 2009–2010: Goyang Orions
- 2010–2012: Incheon Electroland Elephants
- 2013: Barangay Ginebra San Miguel
- 2013: Amchit
- 2013: Jiangxi Flaming Horses
- 2013: Wonju Dongbu Promy
- 2014: Seoul Samsung Thunders
- 2014: Caciques de Humacao
- 2014–2015: Al-Muharraq
- 2015: Champville SC
- 2015: Gigantes de Guayana
- 2015: Al Hilal
- 2015: Incheon Electroland Elephants
- 2016: Jeonju KCC Egis
- 2016: Busan KT Sonicboom
- 2016: Saigon Heat
- 2017: Tadamon Zouk
- 2017: Panteras de Miranda
- 2017: Ulsan Mobis Phoebus
- 2017: Toyotsu Fighting Eagles Nagoya
- 2018: Nishinomiya Storks
- Stats at NBA.com
- Stats at Basketball Reference

Herbert Hill (born October 1, 1984) is an American former professional basketball player.

Hill attended Providence College. He stands 6 feet 10 inches (2.08 m). In 2007, Hill became the third Friar to lead the Big East Conference in scoring, following Eric Murdock and Ryan Gomes. Hill was drafted in the second round, 55th overall, by the Utah Jazz in the 2007 NBA draft, and subsequently traded to the Philadelphia 76ers. However, he has never played in the NBA, instead embarking on a long career overseas.

On December 17, 2014, Hill signed with Al Muharraq of Bahrain. On March 3, 2015, he signed with Champville SC of the Lebanese Basketball League. In April 2015, he signed with Gigantes de Guayana of Venezuela.

In December 2016, Hill was signed by the Saigon Heat of the ASEAN Basketball League to replace the injured Christien Charles.
