= 2006–07 Notre Dame Fighting Irish men's basketball team =

American college basketball season

2006–07 Notre Dame Fighting Irish men's basketball

NCAA tournament, first round
- Conference: Big East Conference

Ranking
- AP: No. 17
- Record: 24–8 (11–5 Big East)
- Head coach: Mike Brey (7th season)
- Assistant coaches: Sean Kearney; Gene Cross; Rod Balanis
- Home arena: Edmund P. Joyce Center

2006–07 Big East men's basketball standings
	Conf.				Overall
Team	W		L	PCT	W		L	PCT
No. 8 Georgetown †	13	–	3	.813	30	–	7	.811
No. 16 Louisville	12	–	4	.750	24	–	10	.706
No. 12 Pittsburgh	12	–	4	.750	29	–	8	.784
No. 17 Notre Dame	11	–	5	.688	24	–	8	.750
No. 20 Marquette	10	–	6	.625	24	–	10	.706
West Virginia	9	–	7	.563	27	–	9	.750
DePaul	9	–	7	.563	20	–	14	.588
Villanova	9	–	7	.563	22	–	11	.667
Providence	8	–	8	.500	18	–	13	.581
St. John's	7	–	9	.438	16	–	15	.516
Connecticut	6	–	10	.375	17	–	14	.548
*Seton Hall	4	–	12	.250	13	–	16	.448
*South Florida	3	–	13	.188	12	–	18	.400
*Rutgers	3	–	13	.188	10	–	19	.345
*Cincinnati	2	–	14	.125	11	–	19	.367
**Syracuse	0	–	6	.000	2	–	11	.154
† 2007 Big East tournament winner As of April 2, 2007; Rankings from AP Poll; *Did not qualify for 2007 Big East tournament **Syracuse had 22 regular season games and two postseason games vacated due to sanctions against the program; Syracuse′s disputed record was 10–6, 24–11.

The 2006–07 Notre Dame Fighting Irish men's basketball team represented the University of Notre Dame during the college basketball season of 2006-07, competing in the Big East Conference. The team was led by seventh-year head coach, Mike Brey, and played their home games in the Edmund P. Joyce Center in Notre Dame, Indiana.

Notre Dame began the season playing an out of conference schedule that included the Paradise Jam tournament and reached their conference games with a 12–1 record. The team finished the season ranked 17th in the Associated Press (AP) Poll, and had a 24–8 record overall (11–5 Big East).

== Roster ==
2006–07 Notre Dame Fighting Irish men's basketball team
Players
Coaches

Pos.	#	Name	Height	Weight	Year	Hometown
F	44	Luke Harangody	6 ft 8 in (2.03 m)	246 lb (112 kg)	Fr	Schererville, Indiana
G	15	Colin Falls	6 ft 5 in (1.96 m)	200 lb (91 kg)	Sr	Park Ridge, Illinois
G	43	Russell Carter	6 ft 4 in (1.93 m)	220 lb (100 kg)	Sr	Paulsboro, New Jersey
F	31	Rob Kurz	6 ft 9 in (2.06 m)	232 lb (105 kg)	Jr	Lower Gwynedd, Pennsylvania
F	40	Luke Zeller	6 ft 11 in (2.11 m)	245 lb (111 kg)	So	Washington, Indiana

Head coach

- Mike Brey

Assistant coach(es)

Legend

- (C) Team captain
- (S) Suspended
- (I) Ineligible
- (W) Walk-on
- Injured
- Current redshirt

== Schedule and results ==
Date time, TV	Rank^{#}	Opponent^{#}	Result	Record	Site (attendance) city, state
Regular season
Nov 10, 2006*		Purdue-Fort Wayne	W 92–49	1–0	Joyce Center; Notre Dame, Indiana
Nov 13, 2006*		vs. Butler	L 69–71	1–1	Conseco Fieldhouse; Indianapolis, Indiana
Nov 14, 2006*		vs. Lafayette	W 92–60	2–1	Conseco Fieldhouse; Indianapolis, Indiana
Nov 19, 2006*		The Citadel	W 74–50	3–1	Joyce Center; Notre Dame, Indiana
Nov 27, 2006*		Lehigh	W 93–87	4–1	Joyce Center; Notre Dame, Indiana
Nov 29, 2006*		Winston-Salem State	W 90–45	5–1	Joyce Center; Notre Dame, Indiana
Dec 3, 2006*		at No. 23 Maryland	W 81–74	6–1	Comcast Center; College Park, Maryland
Dec 7, 2006*		No. 4 Alabama	W 99–85	7–1	Joyce Center; Notre Dame, Indiana
Dec 16, 2006*	No. 21	Elon	W 94–63	8–1	Joyce Center; Notre Dame, Indiana
Dec 19, 2006*	No. 20	Portland	W 86–69	9–1	Joyce Center; Notre Dame, Indiana
Dec 21, 2006*	No. 20	Army	W 88–47	10–1	Joyce Center; Notre Dame, Indiana
Dec 28, 2006*	No. 19	Rider	W 101–51	11–1	Joyce Center; Notre Dame, Indiana
Dec 30, 2006*	No. 19	Stony Brook	W 95–66	12–1	Joyce Center; Notre Dame, Indiana
Jan 3, 2007	No. 17	Louisville	W 78–62	13–1 (1–0)	Joyce Center; Notre Dame, Indiana
Jan 6, 2007	No. 17	at Georgetown	L 48–66	13–2 (1–1)	Verizon Center (15,506); Washington, D.C.
Jan 9, 2007	No. 23	No. 21 West Virginia	W 61–58	14–2 (2–1)	Joyce Center; Notre Dame, Indiana
Jan 14, 2007	No. 23	Seton Hall	W 88–76	15–2 (3–1)	Joyce Center; Notre Dame, Indiana
Jan 17, 2007	No. 20	at Villanova	L 87–102	15–3 (3–2)	Wells Fargo Center; Philadelphia, Pennsylvania
Jan 21, 2007	No. 20	South Florida	W 82–58	16–3 (4–2)	Joyce Center; Notre Dame, Indiana
Jan 23, 2007		at St. John's	L 68–71	16–4 (4–3)	Madison Square Garden; New York, New York
Jan 27, 2007		Villanova	W 66–63	17–4 (5–3)	Joyce Center; Notre Dame, Indiana
Jan 30, 2007		at Syracuse	W 103–91	18–4 (6–3)	Carrier Dome; Syracuse, New York
Feb 3, 2007		at South Florida	L 63–69	18–5 (6–4)	Sun Dome; Tampa, Florida
Feb 8, 2007		at DePaul	L 66–67	18–6 (6–5)	Allstate Arena; Rosemont, Illinois
Feb 15, 2007		Providence	W 81–78	19–6 (7–5)	Joyce Center; Notre Dame, Indiana
Feb 18, 2007		at Cincinnati	W 76–64	20–6 (8–5)	Fifth Third Arena; Cincinnati, Ohio
Feb 20, 2007		DePaul	W 78–54	21–6 (9–5)	Joyce Center; Notre Dame, Indiana
Feb 24, 2007		No. 16 Marquette	W 85–73	22–6 (10–5)	Joyce Center; Notre Dame, Indiana
Mar 3, 2007		at Rutgers	W 73–66	23–6 (11–5)	Louis Brown Athletic Center; Piscataway, New Jersey
Big East tournament
Mar 8, 2007*	No. 20	vs. Syracuse	W 89–83	24–6	Madison Square Garden; New York, New York
Mar 9, 2007*	No. 20	vs. No. 9 Georgetown	L 82–84	24–7	Madison Square Garden; New York, New York
NCAA tournament
Mar 16, 2007*	(6 MW) No. 17	vs. (11 MW) No. 22 Winthrop; First Round	L 64–74	24–8	Spokane Veterans Memorial Arena; Spokane, Washington
*Non-conference game. ^{#}Rankings from AP Poll. (#) Tournament seedings in parentheses.
