= 2006–07 Pittsburgh Panthers men's basketball team =

American college basketball season

2006–07 Pittsburgh Panthers men's basketball

NCAA tournament, Sweet Sixteen
- Conference: Big East Conference (1979–2013)

Ranking
- Coaches: No. 10
- AP: No. 12
- Record: 29–8 (12–4 Big East)
- Head coach: Jamie Dixon (4th season)
- Assistant coaches: Mike Rice (1st season); Pat Sandle (6th season); Orlando Antigua (1st season)
- Home arena: Petersen Events Center (Capacity: 12,508)

2006–07 Big East men's basketball standings
	Conf.				Overall
Team	W		L	PCT	W		L	PCT
No. 8 Georgetown †	13	–	3	.813	30	–	7	.811
No. 16 Louisville	12	–	4	.750	24	–	10	.706
No. 12 Pittsburgh	12	–	4	.750	29	–	8	.784
No. 17 Notre Dame	11	–	5	.688	24	–	8	.750
No. 20 Marquette	10	–	6	.625	24	–	10	.706
West Virginia	9	–	7	.563	27	–	9	.750
DePaul	9	–	7	.563	20	–	14	.588
Villanova	9	–	7	.563	22	–	11	.667
Providence	8	–	8	.500	18	–	13	.581
St. John's	7	–	9	.438	16	–	15	.516
Connecticut	6	–	10	.375	17	–	14	.548
*Seton Hall	4	–	12	.250	13	–	16	.448
*South Florida	3	–	13	.188	12	–	18	.400
*Rutgers	3	–	13	.188	10	–	19	.345
*Cincinnati	2	–	14	.125	11	–	19	.367
**Syracuse	0	–	6	.000	2	–	11	.154
† 2007 Big East tournament winner As of April 2, 2007; Rankings from AP Poll; *Did not qualify for 2007 Big East tournament **Syracuse had 22 regular season games and two postseason games vacated due to sanctions against the program; Syracuse′s disputed record was 10–6, 24–11.

The 2006–07 Pittsburgh Panthers men's basketball team represented the University of Pittsburgh in the 2006–07 NCAA Division I men's basketball season. Led by head coach Jamie Dixon, the Panthers finished with a record of 29–8 and made it to the sweet sixteen of the 2007 NCAA Division I men's basketball tournament where they lost to UCLA.
