= 2007 SEC men's basketball tournament =

- Classification: Division I
- Season: 2006–07
- Teams: 12
- Site: Georgia Dome; Atlanta, Georgia
- Champions: Florida Gators (3rd title)
- Winning coach: Billy Donovan (3rd title)
- MVP: Al Horford (Florida)
- Top scorer: Sonny Weems (Arkansas) (75 points)
- Television: CBS, Lincoln Financial Sports

2006–07 Southeastern Conference men's basketball standings
	Conf.				Overall
Team	W		L	PCT	W		L	PCT
East
No. 3 Florida †	13	–	3	.813	35	–	5	.875
Vanderbilt	10	–	6	.625	22	–	12	.647
No. 25 Tennessee	10	–	6	.625	24	–	11	.686
Kentucky	9	–	7	.563	22	–	12	.647
Georgia	8	–	8	.500	19	–	14	.576
South Carolina	4	–	12	.250	14	–	16	.467
West
Mississippi State	8	–	8	.500	21	–	13	.618
Ole Miss	8	–	8	.500	21	–	14	.600
Arkansas	7	–	9	.438	21	–	14	.600
Auburn	7	–	9	.438	17	–	14	.548
Alabama	7	–	9	.438	20	–	12	.625
LSU	5	–	11	.313	17	–	15	.531
† 2007 SEC tournament winner Rankings from AP Poll

The 2007 SEC men's basketball tournament took place on March 8–11, 2007 in Atlanta, Georgia at the Georgia Dome.

Florida won the tournament and received the SEC's automatic bid to the NCAA tournament by beating Arkansas on March 11, 2007 by the score of 77 to 56.

== Television coverage ==
The first, quarterfinal, and semifinal rounds were televised by Lincoln Financial Sports (formerly Jefferson Pilot Sports), and the SEC Championship Game was televised by CBS.

== Final SEC Regular Season Standings ==
SEC East
School	Coach	W	L	Pct	Seed
Florida	Billy Donovan	13	3	.813	E1
Vanderbilt	Kevin Stallings	10	6	.625	E2
Tennessee	Bruce Pearl	10	6	.625	E3
Kentucky	Tubby Smith	9	7	.563	E4
Georgia	Dennis Felton	8	8	.500	E5
South Carolina	Dave Odom	4	12	.250	E6

SEC West
School	Coach	W	L	Pct	Seed
Mississippi State	Rick Stansbury	8	8	.500	W1
Mississippi	Andy Kennedy	8	8	.500	W2
Arkansas	Stan Heath	7	9	.438	W3
Auburn	Jeff Lebo	7	9	.438	W4
Alabama	Mark Gottfried	7	9	.438	W5
LSU	John Brady	5	11	.313	W6

== Bracket ==
First round
W5	Alabama	67
E4	Kentucky	79
E6	South Carolina	52
W3	Arkansas	82
E5	Georgia	80
W4	Auburn	65
W6	LSU	76*
E3	#22 Tennessee	67

Second Round
W1	Mississippi State	84*
E4	Kentucky	82
E2	Vanderbilt	71
W3	Arkansas	72
E1	#6 Florida	74
E5	Georgia	57
W2	Mississippi	80
W6	LSU	60

Semifinals
W1	Mississippi State	72
W3	Arkansas	81
E1	#6 Florida	80
W2	Mississippi	59

Championship game
W3	Arkansas	56
E1	#6 Florida	77

Asterisk denotes game ended in overtime.
