= 2006–07 Vanderbilt Commodores men's basketball team =

American college basketball season

2006–07 Vanderbilt Commodores men's basketball

NCAA tournament, Sweet Sixteen
- Conference: Southeastern Conference

Ranking
- Coaches: No. 19
- Record: 22–12 (10–6 SEC)
- Head coach: Kevin Stallings
- Assistant coaches: Dan Muller; Tom Richardson; King Rice
- Home arena: Memorial Gymnasium

2006–07 Southeastern Conference men's basketball standings
	Conf.				Overall
Team	W		L	PCT	W		L	PCT
East
No. 3 Florida †	13	–	3	.813	35	–	5	.875
Vanderbilt	10	–	6	.625	22	–	12	.647
No. 25 Tennessee	10	–	6	.625	24	–	11	.686
Kentucky	9	–	7	.563	22	–	12	.647
Georgia	8	–	8	.500	19	–	14	.576
South Carolina	4	–	12	.250	14	–	16	.467
West
Mississippi State	8	–	8	.500	21	–	13	.618
Ole Miss	8	–	8	.500	21	–	14	.600
Arkansas	7	–	9	.438	21	–	14	.600
Auburn	7	–	9	.438	17	–	14	.548
Alabama	7	–	9	.438	20	–	12	.625
LSU	5	–	11	.313	17	–	15	.531
† 2007 SEC tournament winner Rankings from AP Poll

The 2006–07 Vanderbilt Commodores men's basketball men's basketball team finished with a 22–12 record (SEC East: 10–6, 2nd) and reached the Sweet 16 of the NCAA tournament. The Commodores were ranked No. 19 in the final ESPN/USA Today (Coaches) poll.

The team was led by head coach Kevin Stallings and played its home games at Memorial Gymnasium.

== Preseason outlook ==
Entering the season, Vanderbilt was picked by the media attending the SEC's media days in October to finish 4th in a strong SEC East, behind the defending national champion Florida, Kentucky and Tennessee. They returned three starters: swingmen Shan Foster and Derrick Byars and point guard Alex Gordon. Foster was their leading scorer last season and was the third-leading returning scorer in the SEC. Vanderbilt lost two starters: Julian Terrell, their top rebounder (7.2 rpg), and rising-junior DeMarre Carroll, their second-leading scorer (12.1 ppg). Terrell graduated, while Carroll unexpectedly decided to transfer to Missouri shortly after the 2005–06 season ended, a decision influenced by the fact that Mizzou's new head coach Mike Anderson is his uncle.

Junior Shan Foster was named by the league's coaches to the preseason all-SEC first team.

== Regular season ==
The Commodores got off to a rocky 1–3 start that included an embarrassing home loss to Furman (15–16 final record, 8–10 Southern Conference). After that, Vanderbilt won 17 of their next 22 games, culminating in an 83–70 home win over then-No. 1 Florida (33–5, SEC East: 14–2, 1st). They entered the NCAA Tournament winning only 2 of their last 5 games, including two losses to Arkansas (21–14, SEC West: 7–9, 3rd), but one of the wins was a come-from-behind 67–65 home win over Kentucky (22–12, SEC East: 9–7, 4th), their fourth straight win over the Wildcats.

Vanderbilt finished the regular season tied for 2nd with Tennessee (24–11, SEC East: 10–6) in the SEC East, four games behind eventual national champion Florida (35–5, SEC East: 14–2, 1st).

== NCAA tournament ==
The Commodores were the No. 6 seed in the East Regional and lost 66–65 to No. 2 seeded Georgetown (30–6, Big East: 13–3, 1st) at East Rutherford, New Jersey. The Commodores defeated No. 11 seeded George Washington (23–9, A-10: 11–5, 3rd) in the first round, 77–44, and No. 3 seeded Washington State (26–7, Pac-10: 13–5, 2nd), 78–74, in two overtimes, at ARCO Arena in Sacramento, California, before losing to Georgetown.

== Awards ==
Following the end of the regular season, head coach Kevin Stallings was named SEC Coach of the Year by his fellow SEC coaches, while senior Derrick Byars was named SEC Player of the Year by the league coaches (the AP chose Chris Lofton of Tennessee). Stallings has now led the Commodores to 20 wins in three of the last four seasons. Byars led the Commodores in scoring with 17.0 points per game and was a unanimous selection to the All-SEC first team. Junior Shan Foster, who averaged 15.6 points per game, was named to the All-SEC second team.

Including NCAA Tournament games, Vanderbilt finished the season 7–3 against teams ranked in the Top 25. Only North Carolina and UCLA had more wins against ranked opponents

== Roster and individual statistics ==
Number	Name	Position	Height	Weight	Year	Hometown	High School	GP	Min	Ppg	Rpg	Apg
0	Jermaine Beal	G	6–3	205	Freshman	DeSoto, Texas	DeSoto	34	16.8	3.8	1.8	1.8
2	David Rodriguez	G	6–2	180	Sophomore	Sarasota, Florida	Out-of-Door Academy	2	2.0	0.5	0.0	0.5
3	Alex Gordon	G	5’11	164	Junior	Pensacola, Florida	Pensacola	34	24.0	7.8	2.4	3.3
4	Derrick Byars	G-F	6–7	230	Senior	Memphis, Tennessee	Ridgeway	34	31.4	17.0	4.9	3.4
11	Alan Metcalfe	F	6–9	265	Junior	St. Helens, England	Notre Dame Academy (Virginia)	21	7.5	2.6	1.9	0.1
14	Aubrey Hammond	G	6–4	184	Junior	Charlottesville, Virginia	Woodberry Forest School	13	4.2	0.8	0.5	0.2
20	Dan Cage	G	6–5	215	Senior	Indianapolis	Bishop Chatard	34	28.9	11.2	3.3	2.2
31	JeJuan Brown	F	6–7	226	Freshman	Biloxi, Mississippi	Biloxi	34	13.3	3.1	2.5	0.6
32	Shan Foster	G-F	6–6	200	Junior	Kenner, Louisiana	Bonnabel	34	32.4	15.6	4.6	2.3
34	George Drake	G	6–4	213	Freshman	Calera, AL	Calera	33	10.3	2.7	1.4	0.6
41	Ross Neltner	F	6–9	247	Junior	Fort Thomas, Kentucky	Highlands	34	25.0	9.2	5.7	2.2
54	Ted Skuchas	C	6–11	242	Senior	Audubon, Pennsylvania	Germantown Academy	34	15.5	4.0	2.6	0.4

== 2006–07 schedule and results ==
Date time, TV	Rank^{#}	Opponent^{#}	Result	Record	Site (attendance) city, state
Exhibition
November 1*; 7:00 pm		Northern State	W 98–94		Memorial Gymnasium (9,016); Nashville, Tennessee
Regular season
November 15*; 8:00 pm, FSN		No. 8 Georgetown	L 70–86	0–1	Memorial Gymnasium (12,414); Nashville, Tennessee
November 21*; 8:00 pm, FSN		at Wake Forest	L 78–88	0–2	Lawrence Joel Veterans Memorial Coliseum (7,258); Winston-Salem, North Carolina
November 25*; 7:00 pm		Elon	W 81–70	1–2	Memorial Gymnasium (10,253); Nashville, Tennessee
November 28*; 7:00 pm		Furman	L 62–70	1–3	Memorial Gymnasium (10,284); Nashville, Tennessee
December 2*; 7:00 pm		Toledo	W 98–93 ^{OT}	2–3	Memorial Gymnasium (10,177); Nashville, Tennessee
December 5*; 8:00 pm, CSS		ETSU	W 104–62	3–3	Memorial Gymnasium (10,012); Nashville, Tennessee
December 7*; 8:00 pm, CSS		Lipscomb	W 59–50	4–3	Memorial Gymnasium (10,855); Nashville, Tennessee
December 9*; 4:00 pm, ESPN2		No. 25 Georgia Tech	W 73–64	5–3	Memorial Gymnasium (12,221); Nashville, Tennessee
December 16*; 7:00 pm		Nicholls State	W 76–40	6–3	Memorial Gymnasium (9,513); Nashville, Tennessee
December 19*; 9:00 am		vs. UPR-Mayagüez; San Juan Shoot-out	W 102–59	7–3	Mario Morales Coliseum (200); Guaynabo, PR
December 20*; 1:00 pm		vs. Tennessee Tech; San Juan Shoot-out	W 75–62	8–3	Mario Morales Coliseum (200); Guaynabo, PR
December 21*; 3:00 pm		vs. Appalachian State; San Juan Shoot-out	L 79–87 ^{OT}	8–4	Mario Morales Coliseum (200); Guaynabo, PR
December 29*; 7:00 pm		Alabama A&M	W 86–47	9–4	Memorial Gymnasium (9,739); Nashville, Tennessee
January 2*; 7:00 pm, CSS		at Rice	W 74–69	10–4	Autry Court (1,776); Houston
January 6; 5:30 pm, FSN		at Auburn	L 65–68	10–5 (0–1)	Beard-Eaves-Memorial Coliseum (6,088); Auburn, AL
January 10; 7:00 pm		No. 16 Tennessee	W 82–81	11–5 (1–1)	Memorial Gymnasium (14,316); Nashville, Tennessee
January 13; 3:00 pm		at Georgia	L 73–85	11–6 (1–2)	Stegeman Coliseum (7,311); Athens, Georgia
January 17; 7:00 pm		No. 10 Alabama	W 94–73	12–6 (2–2)	Memorial Gymnasium (13,672); Nashville, Tennessee
January 20; 3:00 pm, LFS		at No. 25 Kentucky	W 72–67	13–6 (3–2)	Rupp Arena (24,284); Lexington, Kentucky
January 24; 7:00 pm		at No. 21 LSU	W 64–53	14–6 (4–2)	Pete Maravich Assembly Center (10,006); Baton Rouge, Louisiana
January 27; 12:00 pm, LFS		Mississippi	W 85–80	15–6 (5–2)	Memorial Gymnasium (11,812); Nashville, Tennessee
January 31; 6:00 pm, LFS		at No. 1 Florida	L 64–74	15–7 (5–3)	O'Connell Center (12,370); Gainesville, Florida
February 3; 6:00 pm, FSN		Georgia	W 66–61	16–7 (6–3)	Memorial Gymnasium (13,511); Nashville, Tennessee
February 10; 12:00 pm, LFS		at Tennessee	L 57–84	16–8 (6–4)	Thompson–Boling Arena (21,493); Knoxville, Tennessee
February 14; 7:00 pm		South Carolina	W 78–68	17–8 (7–4)	Memorial Gymnasium (12,588); Nashville, Tennessee
February 17; 12:00 pm, CBS		No. 1 Florida	W 83–70	18–8 (8–4)	Memorial Gymnasium (14,316); Nashville, Tennessee
February 21; 7:00 pm	No. 17	at Mississippi State	L 70–83	18–9 (8–5)	Humphrey Coliseum (9,832); Starkville, Mississippi
February 25; 1:00 pm, LFS	No. 17	Kentucky	W 67–65	19–9 (9–5)	Memorial Gymnasium (14,316); Nashville, Tennessee
February 28; 6:30 pm	No. 19	at South Carolina	W 99–90 ^{OT}	20–9 (10–5)	Colonial Center (11,852); Columbia, South Carolina
March 3; 12:00 pm	No. 19	Arkansas	L 67–82	20–10 (10–6)	Memorial Gymnasium (13,285); Nashville, Tennessee
SEC tournament
March 9; 2:15 pm, LFS	(E2)	vs. (W3) Arkansas; Quarterfinals	L 71–72	20–11	Georgia Dome (17,068); Atlanta
NCAA tournament
March 15*; 3:55 pm, CBS	(6 E)	vs. (11 E) George Washington; First Round	W 77–44	21–11	ARCO Arena (16,338); Sacramento, California
March 17*; 4:40 pm, CBS	(6 E)	vs. (3 E) No. 13 Washington State; Second Round	W 78–74 ^{2OT}	22–11	ARCO Arena (16,407); Sacramento, California
March 23*; 6:27 pm, CBS	(6 E)	vs. (2 E) No. 9 Georgetown; Sweet Sixteen	L 65–66	22–12	Continental Airlines Arena (19,557); East Rutherford, New Jersey
*Non-conference game. ^{#}Rankings from AP Poll. (#) Tournament seedings in parentheses. All times are in Central Time.
