= 2007 National Invitation Tournament =

Annual NCAA basketball competition

- Season: 2006–07
- Teams: 32
- Finals site: Madison Square Garden, New York City
- Champions: West Virginia Mountaineers (2nd title)
- Runner-up: Clemson Tigers (2nd title game)
- Semifinalists: Air Force Falcons (1st semifinal); Mississippi State Bulldogs (1st semifinal)
- Winning coach: John Beilein (1st title)
- MVP: Frank Young (West Virginia)

The 2007 National Invitation Tournament was a single-elimination tournament of 32 National Collegiate Athletic Association (NCAA) Division I teams which did not participate in the 2007 NCAA Division I men's basketball tournament. The West Virginia University Mountaineers won the 2007 NIT.

The participating teams were selected by the National Invitation Tournament (NIT) selection committee using numerous resources such as computer rankings, results (head-to-head, chronological, last 10 games played, non-conference), and polls. The first round, second round, and quarterfinal games are held at the home court of the higher seed. The semifinal and final round are played at Madison Square Garden in New York City, New York. The 32 participating teams were announced on March 11, 2007. This is the first time since the NIT began seeding that all of the #1 seeds made the Final Four. Not only that, but both of the semifinal matches between the #1 seeds were one point games.

== Selected teams ==
=== Automatic qualifiers ===
The following teams were automatic qualifiers for the 2007 NIT field after losing in their respective conference tournaments; by virtue of winning their conferences' regular season championship and not qualifying for the NCAA tournament.

Team	Conference	Record	Appearance	Last bid
Austin Peay	Ohio Valley	21–11	2nd	2004
Delaware State	MEAC	21–12	2nd	2006
East Tennessee State	Atlantic Sun	24–9	2nd	1983
Marist	MAAC	24–8	2nd	1996
Mississippi Valley State	SWAC	18–15	1st	Never
South Alabama	Sun Belt	20–11	5th	2001
Toledo	MAC	23–9	7th	2004
Vermont	America East	25–7	1st	Never

Thirty-two NCAA Division I teams participated in the 2007 NIT, reduced from the prior years' 40. Teams are chosen by the NIT selection committee based on numerous resources, including "computer rankings, head-to-head results, chronological results, Division I results, non-conference results, home and away results, results in the last 10 games, polls and the coaches' regional advisory committee's rankings". The teams are then seeded according to the NIT's procedures for seeding teams. The teams are then placed into four regions: East, South, West, and North.

East Region
Seed	School	Conference	Record	Berth type
1	West Virginia	Big East	22–9	At-large bid
2	Oklahoma State	Big 12	22–12	At-large bid
3	Drexel	CAA	23–8	At-large bid
4	UMass	A-10	23–8	At-large bid
5	Alabama	SEC	20–11	At-large bid
6	NC State	ACC	18–15	At-large bid
7	Marist	MAAC	24–8	Automatic
8	Delaware State	MEAC	21–12	Automatic

West Region
Seed	School	Conference	Record	Berth type
1	Air Force	MWC	23–8	At-large bid
2	Kansas State	Big 12	22–11	At-large bid
3	DePaul	Big East	18–13	At-large bid
4	Georgia	SEC	18–13	At-large bid
5	Fresno State	WAC	22–9	At-large bid
6	Hofstra	CAA	22–9	At-large bid
7	Vermont	America East	25–7	Automatic
8	Austin Peay	OVC	21–11	Automatic

South Region
Seed	School	Conference	Record	Berth type
1	Clemson	ACC	21–10	At-large bid
2	Syracuse	Big East	22–10	At-large bid
3	Missouri State	MVC	22–10	At-large bid
4	Ole Miss	SEC	20–12	At-large bid
5	Appalachian State	SoCon	25–7	At-large bid
6	San Diego State	MWC	21–10	At-large bid
7	South Alabama	Sun Belt	20–11	Automatic
8	East Tennessee State	A-Sun	24–9	Automatic

North Region
Seed	School	Conference	Record	Berth type
1	Mississippi State	SEC	18–13	At-large bid
2	Florida State	ACC	20–12	At-large bid
3	Michigan	Big Ten	21–12	At-large bid
4	Bradley	MVC	21–12	At-large bid
5	Providence	Big East	18–12	At-large bid
6	Utah State	WAC	23–11	At-large bid
7	Toledo	MAC	19–12	Automatic
8	Mississippi Valley State	SWAC	18–15	Automatic

== First round ==
The first round took place on March 13, 2007, and March 14, 2007. The higher-seeded team hosted each game.

March 13, 2007
Region	Home team	Score	Away team	Venue
North	Mississippi State Bulldogs	82–63	Mississippi Valley State Delta Devils	Humphrey Coliseum – Starkville, MS
North	Michigan Wolverines	68–58	Utah State Aggies	Crisler Arena – Ann Arbor, MI
North	Florida State Seminoles	77–61	Toledo Rockets	Donald L. Tucker Center – Tallahassee, FL
East	West Virginia Mountaineers	74–50	Delaware State Hornets	WVU Coliseum – Morgantown, WV
East	Massachusetts Minutemen	89–87	Alabama Crimson Tide	Mullins Center – Amherst, MA
East	Drexel Dragons	56–63	NC State Wolfpack	Daskalakis Athletic Center – Philadelphia, PA
East	Oklahoma State Cowboys	64–67	Marist Red Foxes	Gallagher-Iba Arena – Stillwater, OK

March 14, 2007
Region	Home team	Score	Away team	Venue
North	Bradley Braves	90–78	Providence Friars	Carver Arena – Peoria, IL
West	Air Force Falcons	75–51	Austin Peay Governors	Clune Arena – Colorado Springs, CO
West	Georgia Bulldogs	88–78	Fresno State Bulldogs	Stegeman Coliseum – Athens, GA
West	DePaul Blue Demons	83–71	Hofstra Pride	McGrath Arena – Chicago, IL
West	Kansas State Wildcats	59–57	Vermont Catamounts	Bramlage Coliseum – Manhattan, KS
South	Clemson Tigers	64–57	East Tennessee State Buccaneers	Littlejohn Coliseum – Clemson, SC
South	Ole Miss Rebels	73–59	Appalachian State Mountaineers	Tad Smith Coliseum – Oxford, MS
South	Missouri State Bears	70–74	San Diego State Aztecs	Hammons Student Center – Springfield, MO
South	Syracuse Orange	79–73	South Alabama Jaguars	Carrier Dome – Syracuse, NY

== Second round ==
The second round took place March 15, 2007, through March 19, 2007. The higher-seeded team hosted the game.

Second Round
Date	Region	Home team	Score	Away team	Venue
3/15	North	Florida State Seminoles	87–66	Michigan Wolverines	Donald L. Tucker Center – Tallahassee, FL
3/15	East	West Virginia Mountaineers	90–77	Massachusetts Minutemen	WVU Coliseum – Morgantown, WV
3/16	East	NC State Wolfpack	69–62	Marist Red Foxes	Reynolds Coliseum – Raleigh, NC*
3/17	North	Mississippi State Bulldogs	101–72	Bradley Braves	Humphrey Coliseum – Starkville, MS
3/19	West	Air Force Falcons	83–52	Georgia Bulldogs	Clune Arena – Colorado Springs, CO
3/19	West	Kansas State Wildcats	65–70	DePaul Blue Demons	Bramlage Coliseum – Manhattan, KS
3/19	South	Clemson Tigers	89–68	Ole Miss Rebels	Littlejohn Coliseum – Clemson, SC
3/19	South	Syracuse Orange	80–64	San Diego State Aztecs	Carrier Dome – Syracuse, NY**

*Under normal circumstances, the RBC Center would be used as NC State's home court, but a concert was scheduled that night at that facility, forcing the Wolfpack to use their older arena (still regularly in use for women's basketball), Reynolds Coliseum.

**A new attendance record for a NIT game was set at the Syracuse–San Diego State game in the Carrier Dome. Syracuse won the game 80–64 with the attendance total of 26,752. The old record of 23,522 was set by Kentucky in 1979.

== Quarterfinals ==
The quarterfinals round took place March 20, 2007, and March 21, 2007. (March 22 was reserved as a backup date in case of scheduling conflicts, but none arose.) The higher-seeded team hosted each game.

Quarterfinals
Date	Region	Home team	Score	Away team	Venue
3/20	East	West Virginia Mountaineers	71–66	NC State Wolfpack	WVU Coliseum – Morgantown, WV
3/20	North	Mississippi State Bulldogs	86–71	Florida State Seminoles	Humphrey Coliseum – Starkville, MS
3/21	West	Air Force Falcons	52–51	DePaul Blue Demons	Clune Arena – Colorado Springs, CO
3/21	South	Clemson Tigers	74–70	Syracuse Orange	Littlejohn Coliseum – Clemson, SC

== Semifinals ==
The semifinals round took place March 27, 2007 at Madison Square Garden.

Semifinals
Date	Winner	Score	Opponent	Venue
3/27	West Virginia Mountaineers	63–62	Mississippi State Bulldogs	Madison Square Garden – New York, NY
3/27	Clemson Tigers	68–67	Air Force Falcons	Madison Square Garden – New York, NY

== Finals ==
The finals round took place March 29, 2007 at Madison Square Garden.

Championship
Date	Winner	Score	Opponent	Venue
3/29	West Virginia Mountaineers	78–73	Clemson Tigers	Madison Square Garden – New York, NY

The post-tournament celebration by the Mountaineers was overshadowed by a typographical error on the championship T-shirt, on which the school name was rendered as WEST VIRGINA. The vendor, 6th Man Sportswear, apologized for this mistake, and corrected the spelling for all T-shirts except those 25 printed for the team in preparation for a victory.

== Bracket ==
=== East Region ===
First Round
1	West Virginia	74
8	Delaware State	50
4	Massachusetts	89
5	Alabama	87
3	Drexel	56
6	North Carolina State	63
2	Oklahoma State	64
7	Marist	67

Second Round
1	West Virginia	90
4	Massachusetts	77
6	North Carolina State	69
7	Marist	62

Quarterfinals
1	West Virginia	71
6	North Carolina State	66

=== South Region ===
First Round
1	Clemson	64
8	East Tennessee State	57
4	Mississippi	73
5	Appalachian State	59
3	Missouri State	70
6	San Diego State	74
2	Syracuse	79
7	South Alabama	73

Second Round
1	Clemson	89
4	Mississippi	68
6	San Diego State	64
2	Syracuse	80

Quarterfinals
1	Clemson	74
2	Syracuse	70

=== West Region ===
First Round
1	Air Force	75
8	Austin Peay	51
4	Georgia	88
5	Fresno State	78
3	DePaul	83
6	Hofstra	71
2	Kansas State	59
7	Vermont	57

Second Round
1	Air Force	83
4	Georgia	52
3	DePaul	70
2	Kansas State	65

Quarterfinals
1	Air Force	52
3	DePaul	51

=== North Region ===
First Round
1	Mississippi State	82
8	Miss. Valley State	63
4	Bradley	90
5	Providence	78
3	Michigan	68
6	Utah State	58
2	Florida State	77
7	Toledo	61

Second Round
1	Mississippi State	101
4	Bradley	72
3	Michigan	66
2	Florida State	87

Quarterfinals
1	Mississippi State	86
2	Florida State	71

=== Semifinals and Finals ===
Semifinals
1	West Virginia	63
1	Mississippi State	62
1	Clemson	68
1	Air Force	67

Finals
1	West Virginia	78
1	Clemson	73

== See also ==
- 2007 Women's National Invitation Tournament
- 2007 NCAA Division I men's basketball tournament
- 2007 NCAA Division II men's basketball tournament
- 2007 NCAA Division III men's basketball tournament
- 2007 NCAA Division I women's basketball tournament
- 2007 NAIA Division I men's basketball tournament
- 2007 NAIA Division II men's basketball tournament
