= 2006–07 Tennessee Volunteers basketball team =

American college basketball season

2006–07 Tennessee Volunteers basketball

NCAA tournament, Sweet Sixteen
- Conference: Southeastern Conference
- East

Ranking
- Coaches: No. 18
- AP: No. 25
- Record: 24–11 (10–6 SEC)
- Head coach: Bruce Pearl (2nd season)
- Assistant coaches: Tony Jones; Steve Forbes; Jason Shay
- Home arena: Thompson–Boling Arena

2006–07 Southeastern Conference men's basketball standings
	Conf.				Overall
Team	W		L	PCT	W		L	PCT
East
No. 3 Florida †	13	–	3	.813	35	–	5	.875
Vanderbilt	10	–	6	.625	22	–	12	.647
No. 25 Tennessee	10	–	6	.625	24	–	11	.686
Kentucky	9	–	7	.563	22	–	12	.647
Georgia	8	–	8	.500	19	–	14	.576
South Carolina	4	–	12	.250	14	–	16	.467
West
Mississippi State	8	–	8	.500	21	–	13	.618
Ole Miss	8	–	8	.500	21	–	14	.600
Arkansas	7	–	9	.438	21	–	14	.600
Auburn	7	–	9	.438	17	–	14	.548
Alabama	7	–	9	.438	20	–	12	.625
LSU	5	–	11	.313	17	–	15	.531
† 2007 SEC tournament winner Rankings from AP Poll

The 2006–07 Tennessee Volunteers basketball team represented the University of Tennessee as a member of the Southeastern Conference during the 2006–07 NCAA Division I men's basketball season. Led by second-year head coach Bruce Pearl, the Volunteers played their home games at Thompson–Boling Arena in Knoxville, Tennessee. Tennessee finished third in the SEC East division standings, then were knocked out of the SEC Tournament in the quarterfinal round. After receiving an at-large bid to the NCAA tournament as the No. 5 seed in the Southeast region, Tennessee reached the Sweet Sixteen before losing to No. 1 seed and eventual National runner-up Ohio State by a single point in the regional semi-final. The team finished the season with a 24–11 record (10–6 SEC).

== Roster ==
2006–07 Tennessee Volunteers men's basketball team
Players
Coaches

Pos.	#	Name	Height	Weight	Year	Hometown
G	2	JaJuan Smith	6 ft 2 in (1.88 m)	195 lb (88 kg)	Jr	Cleveland, Tennessee
F	4	Wayne Chism	6 ft 9 in (2.06 m)	246 lb (112 kg)	Fr	Jackson, Tennessee
G	5	Chris Lofton	6 ft 2 in (1.88 m)	200 lb (91 kg)	So	Maysville, Kentucky
G	12	Ramar Smith	6 ft 2 in (1.88 m)	200 lb (91 kg)	Fr	Mount Clemens, Michigan
G	23	Dane Bradshaw	6 ft 4 in (1.93 m)	205 lb (93 kg)	Sr	Memphis, Tennessee
F	32	Duke Crews	6 ft 8 in (2.03 m)	233 lb (106 kg)	Fr	Hampton, Virginia

Head coach

- Bruce Pearl

Assistant coach(es)

Legend

- (C) Team captain
- (S) Suspended
- (I) Ineligible
- (W) Walk-on
- Injured
- Current redshirt

== Schedule and results ==
Date time, TV	Rank^{#}	Opponent^{#}	Result	Record	Site (attendance) city, state
Exhibition
Oct 31, 2006*; 7:30 p.m.		LeMoyne–Owen	W 126–66		Thompson-Boling Arena; Knoxville, Tennessee
Nov 3, 2006*; 7:30 p.m.		Tusculum	W 100–57		Thompson-Boling Arena; Knoxville, Tennessee
Non-conference regular season
Nov 10, 2006*; 7:30 p.m.	No. 25	Middle Tennessee	W 83–52	1–0	Thompson-Boling Arena (17,798); Knoxville, Tennessee
Nov 13, 2006*; 8:00 p.m.	No. 25	vs. Fordham	W 78–71	2–0	Bridgestone Arena (3,186); Nashville, Tennessee
Nov 14, 2006*; 9:00 p.m.	No. 25	vs. UNC Wilmington	W 87–75	3–0	Bridgestone Arena (3,351); Nashville, Tennessee
Nov 19, 2006*; 4:00 p.m.	No. 25	Coppin State	W 99–65	4–0	Thompson-Boling Arena (21,633); Knoxville, Tennessee
Nov 22, 2006*; 7:00 p.m.	No. 22	vs. Butler; NIT Season Tip-Off	L 44–56	4–1	Madison Square Garden (9,123); New York, New York
Nov 24, 2006*; 4:30 p.m.	No. 22	vs. No. 2 North Carolina; NIT Season Tip-Off Consolation	L 87–101	4–2	Madison Square Garden (9,498); New York, New York
Nov 27, 2006*; 8:00 p.m.		at Louisiana–Lafayette	W 77–67	5–2	Cajundome (4,364); Lafayette, Louisiana
Dec 1, 2006*; 7:00 p.m.		Murray State	W 89–64	6–2	Thompson-Boling Arena (16,807); Knoxville, Tennessee
Dec 6, 2006*; 9:00 p.m., ESPN2		No. 16 Memphis	W 76–58	7–2	Thompson-Boling Arena (19,714); Knoxville, Tennessee
Dec 16, 2006*; 4:00 p.m.		Western Kentucky	W 93–79	8–2	Thompson-Boling Arena (17,895); Knoxville, Tennessee
Dec 18, 2006*; 7:00 p.m.		vs. No. 15 Oklahoma State	W 79–77	10–2	Bridgestone Arena (8,118); Nashville, Tennessee
Dec 23, 2006*; 12:00 p.m.		Texas	W 111–105 ^{OT}	10–2	Thompson-Boling Arena (20,778); Knoxville, Tennessee
Dec 28, 2006*; 7:00 p.m.	No. 21	Tennessee Tech	W 101–77	11–2	Thompson-Boling Arena (19,001); Knoxville, Tennessee
Dec 30, 2006*; 8:00 p.m.	No. 21	East Tennessee State	W 93–88	12–2	Thompson-Boling Arena (18,216); Knoxville, Tennessee
SEC regular season
Jan 7, 2007; 4:00 p.m.	No. 19	Mississippi State	W 92–84	13–2 (1–0)	Thompson-Boling Arena (17,603); Knoxville, Tennessee
Jan 10, 2007; 8:00 p.m.	No. 16	at Vanderbilt	L 81–82	13–3 (1–1)	Memorial Gymnasium (14,316); Nashville, Tennessee
Jan 13, 2007*; 1:00 p.m.	No. 16	at No. 5 Ohio State	L 66–68	13–4	Value City Arena (18,817); Columbus, Ohio
Jan 17, 2007; 8:00 p.m.	No. 22	at Auburn	L 80–83	13–5 (1–2)	Beard–Eaves–Memorial Coliseum (8,271); Auburn, Alabama
Jan 20, 2007; 6:00 p.m.	No. 22	South Carolina	W 64–61	14–5 (2–2)	Thompson-Boling Arena (23,238); Knoxville, Tennessee
Jan 24, 2007; 8:00 p.m.		Ole Miss	L 69–83	14–6 (2–3)	Tad Smith Coliseum (8,052); Oxford, Mississippi
Jan 28, 2007; 1:00 p.m., CBS		at Kentucky	L 57–76	14–7 (2–4)	Rupp Arena (24,311); Lexington, Kentucky
Jan 31, 2007; 7:30 p.m.		Georgia	W 82–71	15–7 (3–4)	Thompson-Boling Arena (17,686); Knoxville, Tennessee
Feb 3, 2007; 3:00 p.m., LFS		at No. 1 Florida	L 78–94	15–8 (3–5)	O'Connell Center (12,222); Gainesville, Florida
Feb 6, 2007; 9:00 p.m.		LSU	W 70–67	16–8 (4–5)	Thompson-Boling Arena (17,274); Knoxville, Tennessee
Feb 10, 2007; 1:00 p.m., LFS		No. 23 Vanderbilt	W 84–57	17–8 (5–5)	Thompson-Boling Arena (21,493); Knoxville, Tennessee
Feb 13, 2007; 7:00 p.m., ESPN		No. 20 Kentucky	W 89–85	18–8 (6–5)	Thompson-Boling Arena (22,320); Knoxville, Tennessee
Feb 17, 2007; 3:30 p.m.		at South Carolina	L 64–81	18–9 (6–6)	Colonial Center (12,789); Columbia, South Carolina
Feb 21, 2007; 8:00 p.m.		No. 25 Alabama	W 69–66 ^{OT}	19–9 (7–6)	Thompson-Boling Arena (19,068); Knoxville, Tennessee
Feb 24, 2007; 1:00 p.m., LFS		at Arkansas	W 83–72	20–9 (8–6)	Bud Walton Arena (18,903); Fayetteville, Arkansas
Feb 27, 2007; 9:00 p.m., ESPN		No. 4 Florida	W 86–76	21–9 (9–6)	Thompson-Boling Arena (24,047); Knoxville, Tennessee
Mar 3, 2007; 4:00 p.m.		at Georgia	W 71–65	22–9 (10–6)	Stegeman Coliseum (10,230); Athens, Georgia
SEC tournament
Mar 8, 2007*; 9:45 p.m.	(E3) No. 22	vs. (W6) LSU; Quarterfinals	L 67–76 ^{OT}	22–10	Georgia Dome (14,574); Atlanta, Georgia
NCAA tournament
Mar 16, 2007*; 2:45 p.m.	(5 SE) No. 25	vs. (12 SE) Long Beach State; First round	W 121–86	23–10	Nationwide Arena; Columbus, Ohio
Mar 18, 2007*; 12:10 p.m.	(5 SE) No. 25	vs. (4 SE) Virginia; Second Round	W 77–74	24–10	Nationwide Arena; Columbus, Ohio
Mar 22, 2007*; 9:57 p.m.	(5 SE) No. 25	vs. (1 SE) No. 1 Ohio State; Southeast Regional semifinal – Sweet Sixteen	L 84–85	24–11	Alamodome (26,776); San Antonio, Texas
*Non-conference game. ^{#}Rankings from AP Poll. (#) Tournament seedings in parentheses. SE=Southeast. All times are in Eastern Time.
