= 2006–07 Florida Gators men's basketball team =

American college basketball season

2006–07 Florida Gators men's basketball

NCAA tournament National Champions SEC tournament champions SEC regular season champions Orange Bowl Basketball Classic champions

National Championship Game, W 84–75 vs. Ohio State
- Conference: Southeastern Conference
- East

Ranking
- Coaches: No. 1
- AP: No. 3
- Record: 35–5 (13–3 SEC)
- Head coach: Billy Donovan (11th season)
- Assistant coach: Donnie Jones; Lewis Preston; Larry Shyatt
- Home arena: O'Connell Center

2006–07 Southeastern Conference men's basketball standings
	Conf.				Overall
Team	W		L	PCT	W		L	PCT
East
No. 3 Florida †	13	–	3	.813	35	–	5	.875
Vanderbilt	10	–	6	.625	22	–	12	.647
No. 25 Tennessee	10	–	6	.625	24	–	11	.686
Kentucky	9	–	7	.563	22	–	12	.647
Georgia	8	–	8	.500	19	–	14	.576
South Carolina	4	–	12	.250	14	–	16	.467
West
Mississippi State	8	–	8	.500	21	–	13	.618
Ole Miss	8	–	8	.500	21	–	14	.600
Arkansas	7	–	9	.438	21	–	14	.600
Auburn	7	–	9	.438	17	–	14	.548
Alabama	7	–	9	.438	20	–	12	.625
LSU	5	–	11	.313	17	–	15	.531
† 2007 SEC tournament winner Rankings from AP Poll

2006 Florida Gator Midnight Madness celebration
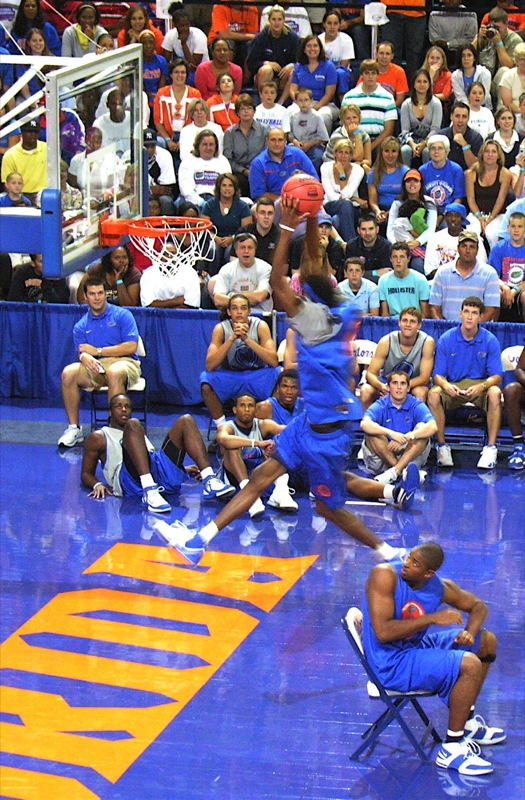
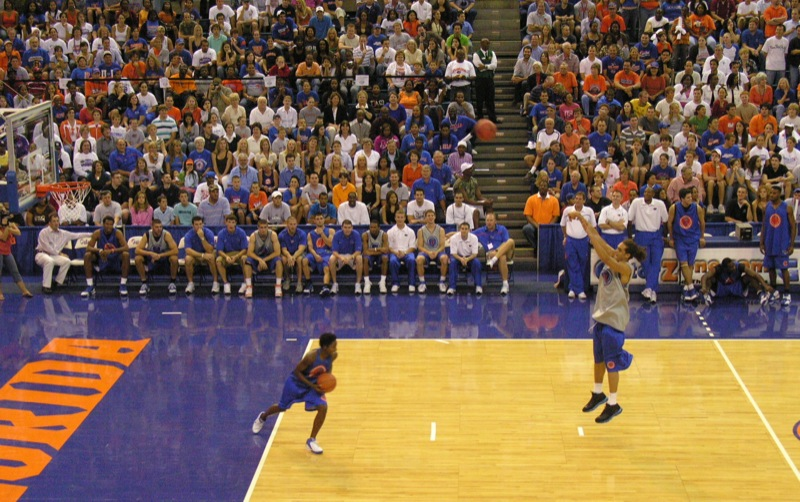
Left: Corey Brewer dunk exhibition. Right: Sha Brooks and Joakim Noah co-ed 3-point shootout.

The 2006–07 Florida Gators men's basketball team represented the University of Florida in the sport of basketball during the 2006–07 college basketball season. The Gators competed in Division I of the National Collegiate Athletic Association (NCAA) and the Eastern Division of the Southeastern Conference (SEC). They were led by head coach Billy Donovan, and played their home games in the O'Connell Center on the university's Gainesville, Florida campus.

The Gators were looking to repeat as national champions. The Gators finished the season with a 26–5 record entering the SEC Championship. They won all three games and received the No. 1 overall seed in the NCAA tournament. They played in the National Championship game against Ohio State. They beat them 84–75 to become the first team since Duke in 1992 to repeat as National Champions, a feat that would not be accomplished again until UConn in 2024.

== Class of 2006 ==
College recruiting
Name	Hometown	School	Height	Weight	Commit date
Greg Elder; SF	Birmingham, Alabama	A.H. Parker High School	6 ft 6 in (1.98 m)	230 lb (100 kg)	Oct 19, 2005
Greg Elder; SF	Recruit ratings: Scout: Rivals:				
Brandon Powell; SG	Memphis, Tennessee	Mitchell Road HS	6 ft 4 in (1.93 m)	190 lb (86 kg)	Aug 24, 2005
Brandon Powell; SG	Recruit ratings: Scout: Rivals:				
Marreese Speights; C	Chatham, Virginia	Hargrave Military Academy	6 ft 10 in (2.08 m)	245 lb (111 kg)	May 14, 2005
Marreese Speights; C	Recruit ratings: Scout: Rivals:				
Dan Werner; PF	Lincroft, New Jersey	Christian Brothers Academy	6 ft 7 in (2.01 m)	220 lb (100 kg)	Jun 17, 2006
Dan Werner; PF	Recruit ratings: Scout: Rivals:				
Overall Recruiting Rankings: Scout – 22 Rivals – 20 ESPN –

== Roster ==
Name	Number	Position	Height	Weight	Class	Hometown
Corey Brewer	2	SF	6–9	185	Junior	Portland, Tennessee
Taurean Green	11	PG	6–0	177	Junior	Ft. Lauderdale, Florida
Walter Hodge	15	PG	6–0	170	Sophomore	Guaynabo, Puerto Rico
Al Horford	42	PF	6–10	245	Junior	Puerto Plata, Dominican Republic
Lee Humphrey	12	PG	6–2	192	Senior	Maryville, Tennessee
Jonathan Mitchell	23	F	6–7	243	Freshman	Mt. Vernon, New York
Joakim Noah	13	C	6–11	230	Junior	New York, New York
Brandon Powell	3	SG	6–3	187	Freshman	Memphis, Tennessee
Chris Richard	32	PF	6–9	255	Senior	Lakeland, Florida
Marreese Speights	34	C	6–10	245	Freshman	St. Petersburg, Florida
Brett Swanson	1	PG	6–2	180	Senior	Pace, Florida
Garrett Tyler	25	SG	6–7	200	Junior	Palm Harbor, Florida
Dan Werner	21	SF	6–7	235	Freshman	Middletown, New Jersey

=== Coaches ===
Name	Type	College	Graduating year
Billy Donovan	Head coach	Providence College	1987
Donnie Jones	Associate Head Coach	Pikeville College	1988
Larry Shyatt	Assistant Coach	College of Wooster	1973
Lewis Preston	Assistant Coach	Virginia Military Institute	1993
Darren Hertz	Assistant to the Head Coach	University of Florida	1997
Adam Beaupre	Video Coordinator	University of Florida	1999
Matt Herring	Strength & Conditioning Coordinator	University of Texas Southwestern	1994
Dave Werner	Athletic Trainer	Eastern Kentucky University	1991
Tom Williams	Academic Counselor		

== Schedule and results ==
Date time, TV	Rank^{#}	Opponent^{#}	Result	Record	Site city, state
Exhibition
November 2, 2006*; 7:00 pm	No. 1	Northwood College	W 70-41		O'Connell Center; Gainesville, FL
November 5, 2006*; 3:30 pm	No. 1	Barry	W 83–47		O'Connell Center; Gainesville, FL
Regular season
November 10, 2006*; 8:00 pm, SUN	No. 1	Samford	W 79–54	1–0	O'Connell Center; Gainesville, FL
November 14, 2006*; 7:00 pm, SUN	No. 1	North Florida	W 86–40	2–0	O'Connell Center; Gainesville, FL
November 16, 2006*; 7:00 pm, SUN	No. 1	Jacksonville	W 90–61	3–0	O'Connell Center; Gainesville, FL
November 18, 2006*; 7:00 pm, FSN	No. 1	Tennessee-Chattanooga	W 93–44	4–0	O'Connell Center; Gainesville, FL
November 21, 2006*; 7:30 pm, SUN	No. 1	Prairie View A&M	W 94–33	5–0	O'Connell Center; Gainesville, FL
November 24, 2006*; 10:30 pm, SUN	No. 1	vs. Western Kentucky	W 101–68	6–0	Orleans Arena; Paradise, NV
November 25, 2006*; 11:00 pm, ESPN2	No. 1	vs. No. 12 Kansas	L 80–82 ^{OT}	6–1	Orleans Arena; Paradise, NV
November 28, 2006*; 7:00 pm, FSN	No. 4	Southern	W 83–27	7–1	O'Connell Center; Gainesville, FL
December 3, 2006*; 7:30 pm, FSN	No. 4	at Florida State	L 66–70	7–2	Donald L. Tucker Center; Tallahassee, FL
December 6, 2006*; 7:00 pm, FSN	No. 7	Providence	W 85–67	8–2	O'Connell Center; Gainesville, FL
December 17, 2006*; 6:00 pm, SUN	No. 5	vs. Florida A&M	W 72–57	9–2	St. Pete Times Forum; Tampa, FL
December 20, 2006*; 7:00 pm, SUN	No. 4	Stetson	W 88–67	10–2	O'Connell Center; Gainesville, FL
December 23, 2006*; 4:00 pm, CBS	No. 4	No. 3 Ohio State	W 86–60	11–2	O'Connell Center; Gainesville, FL
December 30, 2006*; 6:30 pm, FSN	No. 3	vs. UAB; Orange Bowl Basketball Classic	W 75–70	12–2	BankAtlantic Center; Sunrise, FL
January 2, 2007*; 6:00 pm, SUN	No. 3	Liberty	W 89–58	13–2	O'Connell Center; Gainesville, FL
January 6, 2007; 12:00 pm, LFS	No. 3	Georgia	W 67–51	14–2 (1–0)	O'Connell Center; Gainesville, FL
January 9, 2007; 7:00 pm, ESPN	No. 2	Arkansas	W 79–72	15–2 (2–0)	O'Connell Center; Gainesville, FL
January 13, 2007; 1:00 pm, LFS	No. 2	at South Carolina	W 84–50	16–2 (3–0)	Colonial Center; Columbia, SC
January 20, 2007; 1:00 pm, LFS	No. 1	Ole Miss	W 79–70	17–2 (4–0)	O'Connell Center; Gainesville, FL
January 24, 2007; 9:00 pm, LFS	No. 1	at Mississippi State	W 70–67	18–2 (5–0)	Humphrey Coliseum; Starkville, MS
January 27, 2007; 5:00 pm, FSN	No. 1	at Auburn	W 91–66	19–2 (6–0)	Beard-Eaves-Memorial Coliseum; Auburn, AL
January 31, 2007; 7:00 pm, LFS	No. 1	Vanderbilt	W 74–64	20–2 (7–0)	O'Connell Center; Gainesville, FL
February 3, 2007; 3:00 pm, LFS	No. 1	Tennessee	W 94–78	21–2 (8–0)	O'Connell Center; Gainesville, FL
February 7, 2007; 7:30 pm, SUN	No. 1	at Georgia	W 71–61	22–2 (9–0)	Stegeman Coliseum; Athens, GA
February 10, 2007; 9:00 pm, ESPN	No. 1	at No. 18 Kentucky; ESPN College GameDay	W 64–61	23–2 (10–0)	Rupp Arena; Lexington, KY
February 14, 2007; 8:00 pm, LFS	No. 1	No. 25 Alabama	W 76–67	24–2 (11–0)	O'Connell Center; Gainesville, FL
February 17, 2007; 1:00 pm, CBS	No. 1	at Vanderbilt	L 70–83	24–3 (11–1)	Memorial Gymnasium; Nashville, TN
February 21, 2007; 8:00 pm, LFS	No. 3	South Carolina	W 63–49	25–3 (12–1)	O'Connell Center; Gainesville, FL
February 24, 2007; 4:00 pm, CBS	No. 3	at LSU	L 56–66	25–4 (12–2)	Maravich Assembly Center; Baton Rouge, LA
February 27, 2007; 9:00 pm, ESPN	No. 4	at Tennessee	L 76–86	25–5 (12–3)	Thompson-Boling Arena; Knoxville, TN
March 4, 2007; 12:00 pm, CBS	No. 4	Kentucky	W 85–72	26–5 (13–3)	O'Connell Center; Gainesville, FL
SEC Tournament
March 9, 2007; 7:30 pm, CBS	No. 6	vs. Georgia; SEC Championship round 2	W 74–57	27–5	Georgia Dome; Atlanta, GA
March 10, 2007; 3:14 pm, CBS	No. 6	vs. Ole Miss; SEC Championship round 3	W 80–59	28–5	Georgia Dome; Atlanta, GA
March 11, 2007; 1:00 pm, CBS	No. 6	vs. Arkansas; SEC Championship game	W 77–56	29–5	Georgia Dome; Atlanta, GA
NCAA Division I Tournament
March 16, 2007; 10:05 pm, CBS	(1) No. 3	vs. (16) Jackson State; First round	W 112–69	30–5	New Orleans Arena; New Orleans, LA
March 18, 2007; 2:15 pm, CBS	(1) No. 3	vs. (9) Purdue; Second round	W 74–67	31–5	New Orleans Arena; New Orleans, LA
March 23, 2007; 7:10 pm, CBS	(1) No. 3	vs. (5) No. 21 Butler; Sweet Sixteen	W 65–57	32–5	Edward Jones Dome; St. Louis, MO
March 25, 2007; 2:40 pm, CBS	(1) No. 3	vs. (3) No. 10 Oregon; Elite Eight	W 85–77	33–5	Edward Jones Dome; St. Louis, MO
March 31, 2007; 8:47 pm, CBS	(1) No. 3	vs. (2) No. 7 UCLA; Final Four	W 76–66	34–5	Georgia Dome; Atlanta, GA
April 2, 2007; 9:21 pm, CBS	(1) No. 3	vs. (1) No. 1 Ohio State; National Championship Game	W 84–75	35–5	Georgia Dome; Atlanta, GA
*Non-conference game. ^{#}Rankings from Coaches' Poll. (#) Tournament seedings in parentheses.

== Rankings ==
Ranking movements Legend: ██ Increase in ranking ██ Decrease in ranking т = Tied with team above or below ( ) = First-place votes
	Week																			
Poll	Pre	1	2	3	4	5	6	7	8	9	10	11	12	13	14	15	16	17	18	Final
AP	1 (63)	1 (65)	1 (66)	4 (3)	7т	5	5	3	3	2 (3)	1 (43)	1 (42)	1 (45)	1 (72)	1 (72)	3 (4)	5	6	3	Not released
Coaches	1 (30)	1 (30)	1 (30)	4 (2)	7	5	4	3	3	2 (2)	1 (23)	1 (23)	1 (26)	1 (30)	1 (31)	3 (1)	4	6	3	1

*AP does not release post-NCAA tournament rankings.

== Regular season ==
The Gators started the regular season trying to repeat as National Champions. They returned all five starters since none of them decided to go into the NBA early. They won their first few games, then they lost to Kansas in Las Vegas. On December 13, Junior Al Horford injured his ankle in practice, and missed a few games in December. Horford however, was able to play against Ohio State, on December 23. The Ohio State-Florida game was a highly anticipated match-up, featuring three of the top big men in the country (Horford, Joakim Noah, and Greg Oden). The Gators held Oden to 7 points and went on to win 86–60. The Gators entered SEC play with a 13–2 record. They started out dominating the SEC. With a 12–0 SEC record the Gators headed to Nashville, Tennessee to take on the Vanderbilt Commodores. They had 17 straight wins, close to a school record, when they lost to Vanderbilt 70–83.

== Accomplishments ==
- Then longest winning streak in school history – 18 games (3 times) (2005/6, 2006/7, since broken by 2013-14 Gators)
- Consecutive 20 + win seasons – 9 years in a row (1998/9-2006/7)
- Then the most wins in school history prior to NCAA tournament – 29 (2006/7, since broken by 2013-14 Gators)
- Then the most wins in a season in school history – 35 (2006/7, since broken by 2013-14 Gators)
- Combined 68–11 record over two years (2005/6 – 2006/7)
- Led nation in field goal percentage (2005/6, 2006/7)
- All 5 starters with positive assists/turnover ratio (2005/6, 2006/7)
- All 5 starters with 1,000 + career points scored (2006/7)
- 2nd out-right SEC regular season championship (2006/7)
- Consecutive SEC tournament championships – 3 years in a row (2004/5–2006/7)
- Consecutive SEC tournament title games – 4 years in a row (2003/4–2006/7)
- SEC record 6 consecutive wins over Kentucky Wildcats (2004/5-2006/7)
- Consecutive appearances in NCAA tournament – 9 years in a row (1998/9–2006/7)
- Two consecutive appearances in NCAA Final Four (2005/6, 2006/7)
- First NCAA national championship (2005/6)
- Second NCAA national championship (2006/7)
- Highest seed (#1) ever in NCAA tournament (2006/7)
- One of 3 teams (UF, Duke, Kansas) to be #6 seed or higher 9 years in a row
- Champs of Coaches vs. Cancer Classic tournament in Madison Sq. Garden (2005/6)
- Coaches vs. Cancer Classic MVP – Green (2005/6)
- SEC Co-Defensive Player of the Year – Brewer (2005/6)
- SEC 6th Man of the Year – Richard (2006/7)
- SEC tournament MVP – Green (2005/6)
- SEC tournament team – Green, Brewer (2005/6)
- SEC tournament MVP – Horford (2006/7)
- SEC tournament team – Horford, Noah, Brewer, Green (2006/7)
- Never trailed in all 3 SEC tournament games
- 3 SEC Players of the Week – Green and Noah (twice) (2005/6)
- 2 SEC Players of the Week – Humphrey and Brewer (2006/7)
- SEC Scholar Athlete of the Year – Humphrey (twice)
- ESPN First Team Academic All-American – Humphrey
- NCAA Minneapolis Regional MVP – Noah (2005/6)
- NCAA Minneapolis Regional All-Regional Team – Noah, Green, Horford (2005/6)
- NCAA Final Four MOP – Noah (2005/6)
- First player with 4 or more blocks in all 6 NCAA Tournament games – Noah (2005/6)
- NCAA tournament individual record 29 blocks – Noah (2005/6)
- NCAA Final Four individual record 10 blocks – Noah (2005/6)
- NCAA Championship Game individual record 6 blocks – Noah (2005/6)
- NCAA tournament 2nd place team record 44 blocks (2005/6)
- 3rd youngest coach to win NCAA title – Coach Donovan (2005/6)
- First team since UCLA in 1968 to win both Final Four games by 15+ points (2005/6)
- NCAA Midwest Regional MVP – Green (2006/7)
- NCAA Midwest Regional All-Regional Team – Green, Humphrey (2006/7)
- NCAA Tournament record + 43 (62–19) rebound margin vs Jackson St (2006/6)
- NCAA Final Four MOP – Brewer (2006/7)
- NCAA Final Four record 17 rebounds vs. UCLA – Horford (2006/7)
- 84.6% shooting percentage in NCAA tournament – Richard (2006/7) (better than Laettner's 78.8% in 1989, but not enough shots to hold record)
- NCAA Tournament career record 47 3-point shots – Humphrey (2003/4-2006/7)
- NCAA Tournament career 4th place 41 blocked shots – Noah (2004/5-2006/7)
- First team since Duke (91–92) to win back-to-back NCAA titles (2005/6-2006/7)
- First group of 5 starters to win back-to-back NCAA titles (2005/6-2006/7)
- 2nd most consecutive NCAA tournament wins (12) since expansion (2005/6-2006/7)
- Never trailed in second half of 4 Final Four games (2005/6-2006/7)
- Average scoring margin of +12.5 points in 4 Final Four games (2005/6-2006/7)
- Average scoring margin of +15.1 points in 12 NCAA T games (2005/6-2006/7)
- School record 37 consecutive foul shots – Green (2005/6)
- School record 113 3-point shots in a season – Humphrey (2005/6, 2006/7)
- School record 39 consecutive games with 3-point shot – Humphrey (2006/7)
- School record only triple double – Brewer (2005/6)[/COLOR]
- Then school record 288 career 3-point shots – Humphrey (2003/4-2006/7, since broken by Kenny Boynton from 2009/10-2012/3)
- School record 112 career wins – Humphrey, Richard (2003/4-2006/7
- School record 141 career games played – Richard (2003/4-2006/7)
- School record 261 career wins – Coach Donovan (1995/6-2006/7)
- School record 22 career NCAA tournament wins – Coach Donovan [/COLOR]
- School record 112 points scored in a tournament game – UF vs Jackson St. (2006/7)
- School record 71 points scored in a half – UF vs Jackson St., 2nd half (2006/7)
- School record 9 assists in a half – Taurean Green, UF vs Jackson St., 2nd half (2006/7)
- School record 62–19 rebounding margin – UF vs Jackson St. (2006/7)
- School record most points in NCAA tournament career – Brewer (2006/7)
- 18 post-season wins in a row (2005/6-2006/7)
- 22–1 post-season record in the last three years (2004/5-2006/7)
- 14 consecutive wins in a dome, including national semis and finals (2004/5-2006/6)
- 19 consecutive wins in the O'Connell Center
- NBA Draft record, with three players in Top 9 selections
