= 2006–07 Arkansas Razorbacks men's basketball team =

American college basketball season

2006–07 Arkansas Razorbacks men's basketball

Old Spice Classic Champions

NCAA tournament, Round of 64
- Conference: Southeastern Conference
- Record: 21–14 (7–9 SEC)
- Head coach: Stan Heath (5th season)
- Assistant coaches: Oronde Taliaferro (5th season); Dan Hipsher (2nd season); Glynn Cyprien (1st season)
- Home arena: Bud Walton Arena

2006–07 Southeastern Conference men's basketball standings
	Conf.				Overall
Team	W		L	PCT	W		L	PCT
East
No. 3 Florida †	13	–	3	.813	35	–	5	.875
Vanderbilt	10	–	6	.625	22	–	12	.647
No. 25 Tennessee	10	–	6	.625	24	–	11	.686
Kentucky	9	–	7	.563	22	–	12	.647
Georgia	8	–	8	.500	19	–	14	.576
South Carolina	4	–	12	.250	14	–	16	.467
West
Mississippi State	8	–	8	.500	21	–	13	.618
Ole Miss	8	–	8	.500	21	–	14	.600
Arkansas	7	–	9	.438	21	–	14	.600
Auburn	7	–	9	.438	17	–	14	.548
Alabama	7	–	9	.438	20	–	12	.625
LSU	5	–	11	.313	17	–	15	.531
† 2007 SEC tournament winner Rankings from AP Poll

The 2006–07 Arkansas Razorbacks men's basketball team represented the University of Arkansas in the 2006–07 college basketball season. It was Stan Heath's fifth and final season as head coach of the Razorbacks. The team played its home games in Bud Walton Arena in Fayetteville, Arkansas.

== Roster ==
Roster information retrieved from the Arkansas basketball media guide and HogStats.com.

2006–07 Arkansas Razorbacks men's basketball team
Players
Coaches

Pos.	#	Name	Height	Weight	Year	Previous school	Hometown
G	21	Patrick Beverley	6 ft 2 in (1.88 m)	172 lb (78 kg)	Fr	Marshall High School	Chicago, Illinois
G	13	Sonny Weems	6 ft 6 in (1.98 m)	201 lb (91 kg)	Jr	West Memphis High School; University of Arkansas-Fort Smith	West Memphis, Arkansas
F	3	Charles Thomas	6 ft 8 in (2.03 m)	245 lb (111 kg)	Jr	Callaway High School	Jackson, Mississippi
G	0	Gary Ervin	5 ft 11 in (1.8 m)	169 lb (77 kg)	RS Jr	Robeson High School; Notre Dame Prep; Mississippi State	Brooklyn, New York
C	5	Darian Townes	6 ft 10 in (2.08 m)	255 lb (116 kg)	Jr	Archbishop Carroll High School; Hargrave Military Academy	Alexandria, Virginia
C	51	Steven Hill	7 ft 0 in (2.13 m)	250 lb (113 kg)	Jr	Branson High School	Branson, Missouri
F	15	Michael Washington	6 ft 9 in (2.06 m)	239 lb (108 kg)	Fr	Genesis One Christian School	McGehee, Arkansas
G	2	Stefan Welsh	6 ft 3 in (1.91 m)	185 lb (84 kg)	Fr	Woodside High School; Hargrave Military Academy	Newport News, Virginia
F	33	Vincent Hunter	6 ft 10 in (2.08 m)	220 lb (100 kg)	RS Jr	J. A. Fair High School	Little Rock, Arkansas
G	14	Sean McCurdy	6 ft 1 in (1.85 m)	188 lb (85 kg)	So	St. Anthony High School	Westport, Connecticut
G	22	Preston Cranford	6 ft 7 in (2.01 m)	208 lb (94 kg)	RS Jr	Heber Springs High School	Heber Springs, Arkansas
F	1	Cyrus McGowan	6 ft 9 in (2.06 m)	236 lb (107 kg)	So	Meridian High School	Meridian, Mississippi
G	11	Colin Hardaway	6 ft 1 in (1.85 m)	190 lb (86 kg)	Fr	Fayetteville High School	Fayetteville, Arkansas
G	12	Andrew Boyd	6 ft 2 in (1.88 m)	188 lb (85 kg)	Fr	Blue Valley High School	Leawood, Kansas

Head coach

- Stan Heath (Eastern Michigan)

Assistant coach(es)

- Oronde Taliaferro (Wayne State (MI))
- Dan Hipsher (Bowling Green)
- Glynn Cyprien (Southern–New Orleans)

Legend

- (C) Team captain
- (S) Suspended
- (I) Ineligible
- (W) Walk-on
- Injured
- Current redshirt

Roster
Last update: January 17, 2021

== Schedule and results ==
Schedule retrieved from HogStats.com.

Date time, TV	Rank^{#}	Opponent^{#}	Result	Record	Site (attendance) city, state
Exhibition
October 31, 2006*		Xavier-Louisiana	W 82–49		Bud Walton Arena; Fayetteville, AR
November 6, 2006*		California University	W 75-68		Bud Walton Arena; Fayetteville, AR
Regular Season
November 10, 2006*		Southeast Missouri State	W 92-52	1-0	Bud Walton Arena (14,182); Fayetteville, AR
November 18, 2006*		Stephen F. Austin	W 70-59	2-0	Bud Walton Arena (14,932); Fayetteville, AR
November 23, 2006*; ESPN2		vs. Southern Illinois; Old Spice Classic (Quarterfinals)	W 61-53 ^{OT}	3-0	The Milk House (1,050); Orlando, FL
November 24, 2006*; ESPN2		vs. Marist; Old Spice Classic (Semifinals)	W 73-64	4-0	The Milk House (1,125); Orlando, FL
November 26, 2006*; ESPN2		vs. West Virginia; Old Spice Classic (Championship)	W 71-64	5-0	The Milk House (1,827); Orlando, FL
November 30, 2006*; ESPN2		at Mizzou	L 64-86	5-1	Mizzou Arena (5,428); Columbia, MO
December 2, 2006*		Missouri-Kansas City	W 71-61	6-1	Bud Walton Arena (14,782); Fayetteville, AR
December 5, 2006*; Arkansas Sports Network (ARSN)		Central Michigan	W 75-59	7-1	Bud Walton Arena (14,732); Fayetteville, AR
December 14, 2006*; ARSN		Oakland	W 91-57	8-1	Bud Walton Arena (14,907); Fayetteville, AR
December 16, 2006*; ESPN		Texas Tech	L 56-71	8-2	Alltel Arena (13,283); North Little Rock, AR
December 20, 2006*; ESPN2		at Texas	L 76-80	8-3	Frank Erwin Center (14,451); Austin, TX
December 22, 2006*; ARSN		Oral Roberts	W 68-56	9-3	Bud Walton Arena (16,152); Fayetteville, AR
December 30, 2006*; ARSN		Louisiana Tech	W 80-50	10-3	Bud Walton Arena (16,072); Fayetteville, AR
January 2, 2007*; ARSN		Tulsa	W 68-59	11-3	Bud Walton Arena (16,222); Fayetteville, AR
January 6, 2007; Lincoln Financial Sports (LFS)		No. 8 Alabama	W 88-61	12-3 (1-0)	Bud Walton Arena (18,553); Fayetteville, AR
January 9, 2007; ESPN		at No. 2 Florida	L 72-79	12-4 (1-1)	Stephen C. O'Connell Center (12,308); Gainesville, FL
January 13, 2007; Fox Sports Networks (FSN)		at Ole Miss	L 72-74	12-5 (1-2)	Tad Smith Coliseum (7,292); Oxford, MS
January 17, 2007; ESPNU		Georgia	L 64-67	12-6 (1-3)	Bud Walton Arena (17,819); Fayetteville, AR
January 20, 2007; CBS		No. 16 LSU	W 72-52	13-6 (2-3)	Bud Walton Arena (19,302); Fayetteville, AR
January 24, 2007		at South Carolina	L 60-66	13-7 (2-4)	Colonial Center (11,776); Columbia, SC
January 27, 2007; LFS		at No. 12 Alabama	W 63-57	14-7 (3-4)	Coleman Coliseum (15,316); Tuscaloosa, AL
February 3, 2007; LFS		Kentucky	L 72-84	14-8 (3-5)	Bud Walton Arena (19,739); Fayetteville, AR
February 7, 2007; LFS		Auburn	W 65-57	15-8 (4-5)	Bud Walton Arena (17,286); Fayetteville, AR
February 10, 2007; LFS		at LSU	L 67-71	15-9 (4-6)	Pete Maravich Assembly Center (6,324); Baton Rouge, LA
February 14, 2007		at Mississippi State	L 60-84	15-10 (4-7)	Humphrey Coliseum (9,451); Starkville, MS
February 17, 2007; FSN		Ole Miss	W 83-66	16-10 (5-7)	Bud Walton Arena (18,054); Fayetteville, AR
February 21, 2007		at Auburn	L 59-67	16-11 (5-8)	Beard-Eaves-Memorial Coliseum (4,551); Auburn, AL
February 24, 2007; LFS		Tennessee	L 72-83	16-12 (5-9)	Bud Walton Arena (18,903); Fayetteville, AR
February 28, 2007; LFS		Mississippi State	W 67-58	17-12 (6-9)	Bud Walton Arena (15,883); Fayetteville, AR
March 3, 2007		at No. 19 Vanderbilt	W 82-67	18-12 (7-9)	Memorial Gymnasium (13,285); Nashville, TN
SEC Tournament
March 8, 2007; LFS	(W3)	vs. (E6) South Carolina; First Round	W 82-52	19-12	Georgia Dome (13,747); Atlanta, GA
March 9, 2007; LFS	(W3)	vs. (E2) Vanderbilt; Quarterfinals	W 72-71	20-12	Georgia Dome (17,068); Atlanta, GA
March 10, 2007; LFS	(W3)	vs. (W1) Mississippi State; Semifinals	W 81-72	21-12	Georgia Dome (17,114); Atlanta, GA
March 11, 2007; CBS	(W3)	vs. (E1) No. 6 Florida; Championship	L 56-77	21-13	Georgia Dome (15,428); Atlanta, GA
NCAA tournament
March 16, 2007*; CBS	(12 E)	vs. (5 E) No. 23 USC; First Round	L 60-77	21-14	Spokane Arena (11,551); Spokane, WA
*Non-conference game. ^{#}Rankings from AP Poll. (#) Tournament seedings in parentheses. All times are in Central Time.
