= Dan Werner =

American professional basketball player (born 1987)

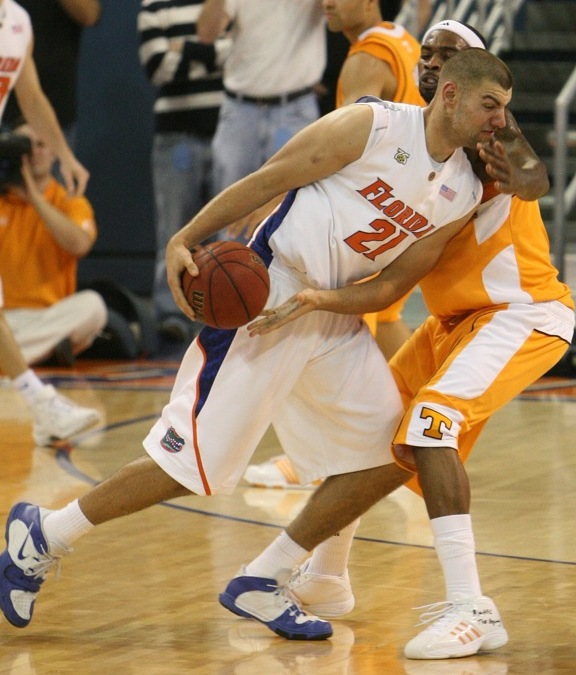

Personal information
- Born: October 9, 1987 (age 39) Middletown Township, New Jersey, U.S.
- Listed height: 6 ft 8 in (2.03 m)
- Listed weight: 228.8 lb (104 kg)

Career information
- High school: Christian Brothers Academy (Middletown Township, New Jersey)
- College: Florida (2006–2010)
- NBA draft: 2010: undrafted
- Playing career: 2010–2013
- Position: Forward

Career history
- 2010–2012: Virtus Bologna
- 2010–2011: → Kaposvári
- 2012–2013: Ferro-ZNTU

Career highlights
- NCAA champion (2007)

Dan Werner (born October 9, 1987) is an American former professional basketball player. He played collegiately at the University of Florida and was a freshman member of Florida's 2007 national champion team. Werner regularly started at forward for the Gators from the 2007–08 season until graduating in the spring of 2010.

After college, Werner signed with Bologna of the Italian Basketball League and was loaned to Kaposvári KK of the Hungarian Basketball League for the 2010–11 season.

== Early life ==
Werner was born in Middletown Township, New Jersey and attended Christian Brothers Academy in New Jersey. He led his high school team to a 27–2 record during his senior year and was honored as New Jersey's "Mr. Basketball" for 2006. Werner originally committed to attend North Carolina State, but reopened the recruiting process after NC State coach Herb Sendek left the school and ended up signing with coach Billy Donovan at Florida.

== High school career ==
Werner attended Christian Brothers Academy (CBA) in Lincroft, New Jersey, where he was a four-year varsity basketball player and one of the most highly regarded prospects in the state. As a senior in 2005–06, he averaged 21.0 points, 10.0 rebounds, and 4.0 assists per game, earning first-team All-State honors from multiple outlets.

He helped lead CBA to three Shore Conference Tournament titles and back-to-back appearances in the NJSIAA Non-Public A South finals. In his junior season, CBA reached the Non-Public A state final before falling to St. Patrick. Werner finished his CBA career with over 1,500 points and was widely recruited by major Division I programs.

Originally committed to North Carolina State University, Werner reopened his recruitment following a coaching change and ultimately signed with Florida, where he joined the reigning national champions in 2006.

== College career ==
Werner played college basketball at the University of Florida, joining the Florida Gators men's basketball team under head coach Billy Donovan. As a freshman during the 2006–07 season, he served as a reserve behind the "04's"—Florida's celebrated starting five that included Joakim Noah, Al Horford, Corey Brewer, Taurean Green, and Lee Humphrey. That group went on to win their second consecutive national championship in 2007. Werner appeared sparingly in the Gators’ NCAA tournament run and did not see action in the title game against Ohio State.

Following the departure of the championship core to the NBA or graduation, Werner was thrust into a starting role as a sophomore during the 2007–08 season. Over the next three seasons, he was a consistent presence in the starting lineup at forward. Despite being known more for his hustle, basketball IQ, and versatility than his scoring, Werner contributed across the stat sheet, often guarding multiple positions and facilitating the offense. However, the Gators failed to make the NCAA Tournament in both 2008 and 2009, instead participating in the NIT.

Werner’s senior season in 2009–10 was marked by a prolonged shooting slump. He lost his starting spot late in the season to Chandler Parsons, who would go on to have a successful collegiate and NBA career. Although some fans criticized Werner’s offensive limitations, Coach Billy Donovan repeatedly praised his leadership, court awareness, and intangibles. "Dan maybe hasn't been the most athletic or most talented guy, but he's one of the smarter guys I've coached. And Dan has always given his best," Donovan said.

Florida returned to the NCAA Tournament in Werner’s senior year, earning an at-large bid. In his final college game, Werner played 36 minutes and recorded 4 points, 5 rebounds, and 2 assists in a double-overtime loss to BYU in the first round.

Over his four-year career, Werner appeared in 138 games for the Gators, starting 87. While he averaged 4.9 points and 4.0 rebounds per game, his contributions were often characterized by his defensive versatility, passing, and willingness to do the "little things" that didn’t always show up on the stat sheet.

== College Stats ==
| Season | Min | Pts | Reb | Ast | To | A/t | Stl | Blk | Pf | Fg% | Ft% | 3p% | Pps |
|---|---|---|---|---|---|---|---|---|---|---|---|---|---|
| 2006–2007 | 8.9 | 1.8 | 1.3 | .8 | .4 | 1.82 | .2 | .1 | 1.1 | .306 | .455 | .224 | 0.82 |
| 2007–2008 | 27.2 | 9.1 | 6.4 | 2.5 | 1.9 | 1.29 | 1.1 | .4 | 2.8 | .440 | .773 | .309 | 1.23 |
| 2008–2009 | 28.4 | 8.9 | 4.9 | 2.3 | 1.6 | 1.45 | 1.2 | .4 | 2.5 | .426 | .791 | .357 | 1.16 |
| 2009–2010 | 27.7 | 4.6 | 4.1 | 2.0 | 1.5 | 1.31 | 1.3 | .1 | 2.3 | .331 | .775 | .260 | 0.98 |

== Professional basketball ==
After completing his collegiate career at the University of Florida, Dan Werner signed a four-year contract with Virtus Bologna of the Italian Serie A in September 2010. Shortly thereafter, he was loaned to Kaposvári KK of the Hungarian Nemzeti Bajnokság I/A for the 2010–11 season.

During his time with Kaposvári, Werner became a regular starter at forward, leading the team in rebounding and three-point shooting percentage. He was named to the league's All-Star team.

Werner returned to Virtus Bologna for the 2011–12 season but saw limited playing time, averaging 1.7 points per game. Following the season, the team declined to pick up his contract option, making him a free agent.

In 2012, Werner signed with Ferro-ZNTU of the Ukrainian Basketball SuperLeague. He played one season before retiring from professional basketball in 2013.
