= 2006–07 Kentucky Wildcats men's basketball team =

2006–07 season of University of Kentucky men's basketball team

2006–07 Kentucky Wildcats men's basketball

NCAA tournament, Round of 32
- Conference: Southeastern Conference
- Eastern
- Record: 22–12 (9–7 SEC)
- Head coach: Tubby Smith (10th season)
- Assistant coaches: Reggie Hanson; David Hobbs; Scott Rigot
- Home arena: Rupp Arena

2006–07 Southeastern Conference men's basketball standings
| | Conf. | | | | Overall |
| Team | W | | L | PCT | W | | L | PCT |
|---|---|---|---|---|---|---|---|---|
East
| No. 3 Florida † | 13 | – | 3 | .813 | 35 | – | 5 | .875 |
| Vanderbilt | 10 | – | 6 | .625 | 22 | – | 12 | .647 |
| No. 25 Tennessee | 10 | – | 6 | .625 | 24 | – | 11 | .686 |
| Kentucky | 9 | – | 7 | .563 | 22 | – | 12 | .647 |
| Georgia | 8 | – | 8 | .500 | 19 | – | 14 | .576 |
| South Carolina | 4 | – | 12 | .250 | 14 | – | 16 | .467 |
West
| Mississippi State | 8 | – | 8 | .500 | 21 | – | 13 | .618 |
| Ole Miss | 8 | – | 8 | .500 | 21 | – | 14 | .600 |
| Arkansas | 7 | – | 9 | .438 | 21 | – | 14 | .600 |
| Auburn | 7 | – | 9 | .438 | 17 | – | 14 | .548 |
| Alabama | 7 | – | 9 | .438 | 20 | – | 12 | .625 |
| LSU | 5 | – | 11 | .313 | 17 | – | 15 | .531 |
† 2007 SEC tournament winner Rankings from AP Poll

The 2006–07 Kentucky Wildcats men's basketball team represented the University of Kentucky in the college basketball season of 2006–07. The team's head coach was Tubby Smith. This was his 10th and final year as Kentucky's head coach. The Wildcats played their home games at Rupp Arena in Lexington, Kentucky.

For the season Kentucky finished with an overall record of 22–12 (9–7 in the SEC) The Wildcats were invited to the 2007 NCAA Division I men's basketball tournament as an #8 seed and won their opening round game over Villanova 67–58. But in the round of 32 they lost to Kansas 88–76.

== 2006 signees ==
College recruiting information (2006)
| Name | Hometown | School | Height | Weight | Commit date |
|---|---|---|---|---|---|
| Derrick Jasper; G | Paso Robles, California | Paso Robles High School | 6 ft 6 in (1.98 m) | 213 lb (97 kg) | Oct 4, 2005 |
| Derrick Jasper; G | Recruit ratings: Scout: Rivals: | | | | |
| Jodie Meeks; G | Norcross, Georgia | Norcross High School | 6 ft 4 in (1.93 m) | 208 lb (94 kg) | Oct 3, 2005 |
| Jodie Meeks; G | Recruit ratings: Scout: Rivals: | | | | |
| Dwight Perry; G | Durham, North Carolina | Southern High School | 6 ft 1 in (1.85 m) | 173 lb (78 kg) | May 24, 2006 |
| Dwight Perry; G | Recruit ratings: Scout: Rivals: | | | | |
| Michael Porter; G | Modesto, California | Modesto Christian High School | 6 ft 3 in (1.91 m) | 198 lb (90 kg) | May 18, 2005 |
| Michael Porter; G | Recruit ratings: Scout: Rivals: | | | | |
| Perry Stevenson; F | Lafayette, Louisiana | Northside High School | 6 ft 9 in (2.06 m) | 207 lb (94 kg) | Oct 22, 2005 |
| Perry Stevenson; F | Recruit ratings: Scout: Rivals: | | | | |
Overall recruit ranking: Scout: 16 Rivals: 26
Note: In many cases, Scout, Rivals, 247Sports, On3, and ESPN may conflict in their listings of height and weight.; In these cases, the average was taken. ESPN grades are on a 100-point scale.; Sources: "Kentucky 2006 Basketball Commitments". Rivals.; "2006 Kentucky Basketball Commits". Scout.; "ESPN". ESPN.; "Scout.com Team Recruiting Rankings". Scout.; "2006 Team Ranking". Rivals.

== Roster ==
2006–07 Kentucky Wildcats men's basketball team
Players
Coaches

| Pos. | # | Name | Height | Weight | Year | Previous school | Hometown |
|---|---|---|---|---|---|---|---|
| G | 1 | Michael Porter | 6 ft 2 in (1.88 m) | 190 lb (86 kg) | Fr | Modesto Christian | Modesto, California |
| G | 3 | Ramel Bradley | 6 ft 2 in (1.88 m) | 191 lb (87 kg) | Jr | IMG Academy (FL) | Brooklyn, New York |
| G | 5 | Derrick Jasper | 6 ft 6 in (1.98 m) | 213 lb (97 kg) | Fr | Paso Robles | Paso Robles, California |
| C | 10 | Łukasz Obrzut | 7 ft 1 in (2.16 m) | 265 lb (120 kg) | Sr | Bridgton Academy | Gliwice, Poland |
| F | 13 | Bobby Perry | 6 ft 7 in (2.01 m) | 215 lb (98 kg) | Sr | Hillside | Durham, North Carolina |
| G | 20 | Jodie Meeks | 6 ft 4 in (1.93 m) | 208 lb (94 kg) | Fr | Norcross | Norcross, Georgia |
| F | 21 | Perry Stevenson | 6 ft 9 in (2.06 m) | 215 lb (98 kg) | Fr | Lafayette | Lafayette, Louisiana |
| F | 22 | Ramon Harris | 6 ft 7 in (2.01 m) | 218 lb (99 kg) | Fr | West Anchorage | Anchorage, Alaska |
| F | 23 | Sheray Thomas | 6 ft 8 in (2.03 m) | 236 lb (107 kg) | Sr | Riverdale Baptist | Montreal, Canada |
| G | 30 | Dwight Perry | 6 ft 1 in (1.85 m) | 187 lb (85 kg) | Fr | Southern | Durham, North Carolina |
| G | 32 | Joe Crawford | 6 ft 5 in (1.96 m) | 207 lb (94 kg) | Jr | Renaissance | Detroit, Michigan |
| C | 33 | Randolph Morris | 6 ft 11 in (2.11 m) | 260 lb (118 kg) | Jr | Landmark Christian | Atlanta, Georgia |
| F | 42 | Mark Coury | 6 ft 8 in (2.03 m) | 238 lb (108 kg) | Fr | Detroit Country Day | Detroit, Michigan |
| C | 43 | Jared Carter | 7 ft 2 in (2.18 m) | 277 lb (126 kg) | So | Scott County | Georgetown, Kentucky |

Head coach

- Tubby Smith (High Point)

Assistant coach(es)

- David Hobbs (VCU)
- Scott Rigot (Buffalo)
- Reggie Hanson (Kentucky)

Legend

- (C) Team captain
- (S) Suspended
- (I) Ineligible
- (W) Walk-on
- Injured
- Current redshirt

== 2006–07 schedule and results ==
| Date time, TV | Rank^{#} | Opponent^{#} | Result | Record | Site city, state |
Non-conference regular season
| November 15, 2006*; 7:00 pm, FSN | No. 22 | Miami(OH) | W 57–46 | 1–0 | Rupp Arena; Lexington, KY |
| November 17, 2006*; 7:00 pm, FSN | No. 22 | Mississippi Valley State | W 79–56 | 2–0 | Rupp Arena; Lexington, KY |
| November 20, 2006*; 9:00 pm, ESPN2 | No. 20 | vs. DePaul; Maui Invitational | W 87–81 | 3–0 | Lahaina Civic Center; Maui, HI |
| November 21, 2006*; 7:00 pm, ESPN2 | No. 20 | vs. No. 5 UCLA; Maui Invitational | L 68–73 | 3–1 | Lahaina Civic Center; Maui, HI |
| November 22, 2006*; 5:00 pm, ESPN2 | No. 20 | vs. No. 11 Memphis; Maui Invitational | L 63–80 | 3–2 | Lahaina Civic Center; Maui, HI |
| November 28, 2006*; 7:00, FSN | | College of Charleston | W 77–61 | 4–2 | Rupp Arena; Lexington, KY |
| December 2, 2006*; 12:00 pm, CBS | | at No. 6 North Carolina | L 63–75 | 4–3 | Dean Smith Center; Chapel Hill, NC |
| December 5, 2006*; 7:00 pm, BBSN | | vs. Chattanooga | W 79–63 | 5–3 | Freedom Hall; Louisville, KY |
| December 9, 2006*; 12:00 pm, CBS | | Indiana | W 59–54 | 6–3 | Rupp Arena; Lexington, KY |
| December 16, 2006*; 1:30 pm, CBS | | at Louisville; Battle for the Bluegrass | W 61–49 | 7–3 | Freedom Hall; Louisville, KY |
| December 19, 2006*; 7:00 pm, FSN | | Santa Clara | W 74–60 | 8–3 | Rupp Arena; Lexington, KY |
| December 22, 2006*; 7:00 pm, BBSN | | Massachusetts | W 82–68 | 9–3 | Rupp Arena; Lexington, KY |
| December 30, 2006*; 11:00 am, BBSN | | Eastern Kentucky | W 78–65 | 10–3 | Rupp Arena; Lexington, KY |
| January 3, 2007*; 7:00 pm, FSN | | Houston | W 77–70 | 11–3 | Rupp Arena; Lexington, KY |
SEC Regular Season
| January 6, 2007; 8:30 pm, FSN | | at Ole Miss | W 68–58 | 12–3 (1–0) | Tad Smith Coliseum; Oxford, MS |
| January 10, 2007; 8:00 pm, LFS | | Auburn | W 84–57 | 13–3 (2–0) | Rupp Arena; Lexington, KY |
| January 13, 2007; 7:00 pm, FSN | | Mississippi State | W 64–60 | 14–3 (3–0) | Rupp Arena; Lexington, KY |
| January 16, 2007; 9:00 pm, ESPN | No. 25 | at South Carolina | W 87–49 | 15–3 (4–0) | Colonial Life Arena; Columbia, SC |
| January 20, 2007; 12:00 pm, LFS | No. 25 | Vanderbilt | L 67–72 | 15–4 (4–1) | Rupp Arena; Lexington, KY |
| January 24, 2007; 8:00 pm, LFS | | at Georgia | L 69–78 ^{OT} | 15–5 (4–2) | Stegeman Coliseum; Athens, GA |
| January 28, 2007; 1:00 pm, CBS | | Tennessee | W 76–57 | 16–5 (5–2) | Rupp Arena; Lexington, KY |
| February 3, 2007; 1:00 pm, LFS | | at Arkansas | W 82–74 | 17–5 (6–2) | Bud Walton Arena; Fayetteville, AR |
| February 7, 2007; 8:00 pm, LFS | No. 20 | South Carolina | W 95–89 | 18–5 (7–2) | Rupp Arena; Lexington, KY |
| February 10, 2007; 9:00 pm, ESPN | No. 20 | No. 1 Florida 'ESPN College GameDay' | L 61–64 | 18–6 (7–3) | Rupp Arena; Lexington, KY |
| February 13, 2007; 7:00 pm, ESPN | No. 20 | at Tennessee | L 85–89 | 18–7 (7–4) | Thompson-Boling Arena; Knoxville, TN |
| February 17, 2007; 3:00 pm, LFS | No. 20 | at Alabama | L 61–72 | 18–8 (7–5) | Coleman Coliseum; Tuscaloosa, AL |
| February 20, 2007; 9:00 pm, LSU | | LSU | W 70–63 | 19–8 (8–5) | Rupp Arena; Lexington, KY |
| February 25, 2007; 2:00 pm, LFS | | at No. 21 Vanderbilt | L 65–67 | 19–9 (8–6) | Memorial Gym; Nashville, TN |
| February 28, 2007; 8:00 pm, LFS | | Georgia; Senior Day | W 82–70 | 20–9 (9–6) | Rupp Arena; Lexington, KY |
| March 4, 2007; 12:00 pm, CBS | | at No. 4 Florida | L 72–85 | 20–10 (9–7) | O'Connell Center; Gainesville, FL |
2007 SEC Tournament
| March 8, 2007; 1:30 pm, LFS | (E4) | vs. (W5) Alabama; First round | W 79–67 | 21–10 | Georgia Dome; Atlanta, GA |
| March 9, 2007; 1:30 pm, LFS | (E4) | vs. (W1) Mississippi State; Quarterfinals | L 82–84 ^{OT} | 21–11 | Georgia Dome; Atlanta, GA |
2007 NCAA Tournament
| March 16, 2007*; 7:45 pm, CBS | (8 W) | vs. (9 W) Villanova; First Round | W 67–58 | 22–11 | United Center; Chicago, Illinois |
| March 18, 2007*; 2:30 pm, CBS | (8 W) | vs. (1 W) No. 2 Kansas; Second Round | L 76–88 | 22–12 | United Center; Chicago, Illinois |
*Non-conference game. ^{#}Rankings from Coaches' Poll. (#) Tournament seedings in parentheses.
