= 2006–07 Mississippi State Bulldogs basketball team =

American college basketball season

2006–07 Mississippi State Bulldogs men's basketball

SEC West Champions

NIT, Final Four
- Conference: Southeastern Conference
- Record: 21–14 (8–8 SEC)
- Head coach: Rick Stansbury (9th season)
- Assistant coaches: Phil Cunningham; Robert Kirby; Mark White
- Home arena: Humphrey Coliseum

2006–07 Southeastern Conference men's basketball standings
	Conf.				Overall
Team	W		L	PCT	W		L	PCT
East
No. 3 Florida †	13	–	3	.813	35	–	5	.875
Vanderbilt	10	–	6	.625	22	–	12	.647
No. 25 Tennessee	10	–	6	.625	24	–	11	.686
Kentucky	9	–	7	.563	22	–	12	.647
Georgia	8	–	8	.500	19	–	14	.576
South Carolina	4	–	12	.250	14	–	16	.467
West
Mississippi State	8	–	8	.500	21	–	13	.618
Ole Miss	8	–	8	.500	21	–	14	.600
Arkansas	7	–	9	.438	21	–	14	.600
Auburn	7	–	9	.438	17	–	14	.548
Alabama	7	–	9	.438	20	–	12	.625
LSU	5	–	11	.313	17	–	15	.531
† 2007 SEC tournament winner Rankings from AP Poll

The 2006–07 Mississippi State basketball team represented Mississippi State University in the 2006–07 college basketball season. Under head coach Rick Stansbury, the team played their home games at Humphrey Coliseum in Starkville, Mississippi, and was a member of the Southeastern Conference.

== Previous season ==
The Bulldogs finished the season 15–15, 5–11 in SEC play. They did not play in a postseason tournament after having made the NCAA Tournament the previous four seasons.

== Before the season ==
=== Departures ===
Name	Number	Pos.	Year	Notes
Michael Boler	20	Guard	Senior	Graduated
Jamall Edmondson	5	Guard	Senior	Graduated
Jerrell Houston	2	Forward	Freshman	Dismissed during previous season
Wesley Morgan	25	Center	Senior	Graduated
Walter Sharpe	42	Forward	Sophomore	Dismissed during previous season

=== Recruits ===
College recruiting information
Name	Hometown	School	Height	Weight	Commit date
Ben Hansbrough; SG	Poplar Bluff, MO	Poplar Bluff HS	6 ft 4 in (1.93 m)	207 lb (94 kg)	Jul 18, 2005
Ben Hansbrough; SG	Recruit ratings: Scout: Rivals:				
Barry Stewart; PG	Shelbyville, TN	Shelbyville Central HS	6 ft 3 in (1.91 m)	165 lb (75 kg)	Apr 14, 2006
Barry Stewart; PG	Recruit ratings: Scout: Rivals:				
Phil Turner; SG	Grenada, MS	Grenada HS	6 ft 3 in (1.91 m)	165 lb (75 kg)	Apr 3, 2006
Phil Turner; SG	Recruit ratings: Scout: Rivals:				
Jarvis Varnado; PF	=Brownsville, TN	Haywood HS	6 ft 9 in (2.06 m)	190 lb (86 kg)	Jul 17, 2005
Jarvis Varnado; PF	Recruit ratings: Scout: Rivals:				
Overall recruit ranking: Scout: 53
Note: In many cases, Scout, Rivals, 247Sports, On3, and ESPN may conflict in their listings of height and weight.; In these cases, the average was taken. ESPN grades are on a 100-point scale.; Sources: "Mississippi State 2006 Basketball Commitments". Rivals.; "2006 Mississippi State Basketball Commits". Scout.; "ESPN". ESPN.; "Scout.com Team Recruiting Rankings". Scout.; "2006 Team Ranking". Rivals.

== Roster ==
2006–07 Mississippi State Bulldogs men's basketball team
Players
Coaches

Pos.	#	Name	Height	Weight	Year	Previous school	Hometown
G	1	Richard Delk	6 ft 4 in (1.93 m)	175 lb (79 kg)	So	North Side HS	Jackson, TN
G	3	Billy Begley (W)	6 ft 1 in (1.85 m)	190 lb (86 kg)	Jr	Webster County HS	Henderson, KY
G	4	Barry Stewart	6 ft 2 in (1.88 m)	165 lb (75 kg)	Fr	Shelbyville Central HS	Shelbyville, TN
G	10	Joseph Iupe (W)	6 ft 1 in (1.85 m)	160 lb (73 kg)	Fr	Madison Central HS	Madison, MS
G	11	Ben Hansbrough	6 ft 3 in (1.91 m)	200 lb (91 kg)	Fr	Poplar Bluff HS	Poplar Bluff, MO
G	20	Phil Turner (redshirt)	6 ft 3 in (1.91 m)	165 lb (75 kg)	Fr	Grenada HS	Grenada, MS
G	22	Dietric Slater	6 ft 3 in (1.91 m)	200 lb (91 kg)	Sr	Wayne County HS	Waynesboro, MS
F	23	Charles Rhodes	6 ft 8 in (2.03 m)	240 lb (109 kg)	Jr	Lanier HS	Jackson, MS
G	24	Reginald Delk	6 ft 4 in (1.93 m)	175 lb (79 kg)	So	North Side HS	Jackson, TN
F	30	Bernard Rimmer	6 ft 8 in (2.03 m)	195 lb (88 kg)	So	Grenada HS	Grenada, MS
F	32	Jarvis Varnado	6 ft 9 in (2.06 m)	195 lb (88 kg)	Fr	Haywood HS	Brownsville, TN
C	40	Vernon Goodridge	6 ft 9 in (2.06 m)	225 lb (102 kg)	So	Lutheran Christian Academy	Brooklyn, NY
F	41	Piotr Stelmach	6 ft 9 in (2.06 m)	240 lb (109 kg)	Sr	SMS Warka	Kamien Pomorski, Poland
G	44	Jamont Gordon	6 ft 4 in (1.93 m)	225 lb (102 kg)	So	Oak Hill Academy	Nashville, TN
F	45	Brian Johnson (redshirt)	6 ft 9 in (2.06 m)	245 lb (111 kg)	Jr	Bishop O'Connell HS	Laurinburg, NC

Head coach

- Rick Stansbury (Campbellsville)

Assistant coach(es)

- Phil Cunningham (Campbellsville)
- Robert Kirby (UTPA)
- Mark White (Austin Peay)

Legend

- (C) Team captain
- (S) Suspended
- (I) Ineligible
- (W) Walk-on
- Injured
- Current redshirt

Roster
