= 2006–07 Alabama Crimson Tide men's basketball team =

American college basketball season

2006–07 Alabama Crimson Tide men's basketball

Paradise Jam tournament champions

NIT, First Round
- Conference: Southeastern Conference
- Western Division
- Record: 20–12 (7–9 SEC)
- Head coach: Mark Gottfried (9th season)
- Assistant coaches: Philip Pearson; James Holland; Tom Asbury
- Home arena: Coleman Coliseum (Capacity: 15,316)

2006–07 Southeastern Conference men's basketball standings
	Conf.				Overall
Team	W		L	PCT	W		L	PCT
East
No. 3 Florida †	13	–	3	.813	35	–	5	.875
Vanderbilt	10	–	6	.625	22	–	12	.647
No. 25 Tennessee	10	–	6	.625	24	–	11	.686
Kentucky	9	–	7	.563	22	–	12	.647
Georgia	8	–	8	.500	19	–	14	.576
South Carolina	4	–	12	.250	14	–	16	.467
West
Mississippi State	8	–	8	.500	21	–	13	.618
Ole Miss	8	–	8	.500	21	–	14	.600
Arkansas	7	–	9	.438	21	–	14	.600
Auburn	7	–	9	.438	17	–	14	.548
Alabama	7	–	9	.438	20	–	12	.625
LSU	5	–	11	.313	17	–	15	.531
† 2007 SEC tournament winner Rankings from AP Poll

The 2006–07 Alabama Crimson Tide men's basketball team (variously "Alabama", "UA", "Bama" or "The Tide") represented the University of Alabama in the 2006–07 college basketball season. The head coach was Mark Gottfried, who was in his ninth season as Alabama. The team played its home games at Coleman Coliseum in Tuscaloosa, Alabama and was a member of the Southeastern Conference. This was the 94th season of basketball in the school's history. The Crimson Tide finished the season 20–12, 7–9 in SEC play, lost in the first round of the 2007 SEC men's basketball tournament. They were invited to the 2007 National Invitation Tournament and lost in the first round.

== Schedule and results ==
Date time, TV	Rank^{#}	Opponent^{#}	Result	Record	Site (attendance) city, state
Non-conference regular season
November 10, 2006*; 7:30 p.m.	No. 11	Jackson State	W 96–65	1–0	Coleman Coliseum (9,430); Tuscaloosa, AL
November 17, 2006*; 12:00 p.m.	No. 10	vs. Middle Tennessee; Paradise Jam tournament	W 71–62	2–0	Virgin Islands Sport & Fitness Center; Saint Thomas, U.S. Virgin Islands
November 19, 2006*; 5:00 p.m.	No. 10	vs. Iowa; Paradise Jam Tournament	W 72–60	3–0	Virgin Islands Sport & Fitness Center; Saint Thomas, U.S. Virgin Islands
November 20, 2006*; 7:30 p.m.	No. 8	vs. Xavier; Paradise Jam tournament championship	W 63–56	4–0	Virgin Islands Sport & Fitness Center (3,032); Saint Thomas, U.S. Virgin Islands
November 25, 2006*; 6:00 p.m.	No. 8	Texas Southern	W 74–44	5–0	Coleman Coliseum (10,005); Tuscaloosa, AL
November 28, 2006*; 6:00 p.m.	No. 6	Louisiana–Monroe	W 75–61	6–0	Coleman Coliseum (12,268); Tuscaloosa, AL
December 2, 2006*; 2:30 p.m.	No. 6	Tennessee State	W 78–60	7–0	Coleman Coliseum (10,215); Tuscaloosa, AL
December 7, 2006*; 8:00 p.m.	No. 4	at Notre Dame	L 85–99	7–1	Purcell Pavilion (10,107); Notre Dame, IN
December 9, 2006*; 6:00 p.m.	No. 4	Alabama State	W 92–58	8–1	Coleman Coliseum (10,239); Tuscaloosa, AL
December 16, 2006*; 7:15 p.m.	No. 9	vs. Southern Miss; Coors Classic	W 77–64	9–1	Mitchell Center (10,041); Mobile, AL
December 20, 2006*; 5:30 p.m.	No. 10	at NC State	W 82–75	10–1	RBC Center (16,456); Raleigh, NC
December 23, 2006*; 2:00 p.m.	No. 10	Coppin State	W 99–49	11–1	Coleman Coliseum (9,058); Tuscaloosa, AL
December 29, 2006*; 7:00 p.m.	No. 8	Lipscomb	W 80–58	12–1	Coleman Coliseum (10,100); Tuscaloosa, AL
January 1, 2007*; 1:30 p.m.	No. 8	Oklahoma	W 70–55	13–1	Coleman Coliseum (11,538); Tuscaloosa, AL
SEC regular season
January 6, 2007; 1:00 p.m.	No. 8	at Arkansas	L 61–88	13–2 (0–1)	Bud Walton Arena (18,553); Fayetteville, AR
January 9, 2007; 8:00 p.m.	No. 14	No. 13 LSU	W 71–61	14–2 (1–1)	Coleman Coliseum (15,316); Tuscaloosa, AL
January 17, 2007; 7:00 p.m.	No. 10	at Vanderbilt	L 73–94	14–3 (1–2)	Memorial Gymnasium (13,672); Nashville, Tennessee
January 20, 2007; 12:30 p.m.	No. 10	Georgia	W 78–76	15–3 (2–2)	Coleman Coliseum (15,316); Tuscaloosa, AL
January 23, 2007; 8:00 p.m.	No. 12	at Auburn; Iron Bowl of basketball	L 57–81	15–4 (2–3)	Beard-Eaves-Memorial Coliseum (10,500); Auburn, AL
January 27, 2007; 2:00 p.m.	No. 12	Arkansas	L 57–63	15–5 (2–4)	Coleman Coliseum (15,316); Tuscaloosa, AL
January 31, 2007; 8:00 p.m.	No. 19	at LSU	W 73–70	16–5 (3–4)	Pete Maravich Assembly Center (11,313); Baton Rouge, Louisiana
February 3, 2007; 2:00 p.m.	No. 19	South Carolina	W 64–61	17–5 (4–4)	Coleman Coliseum (15,316); Tuscaloosa, AL
February 7, 2007; 7:00 p.m., Raycom	No. 18	Mississippi State	W 80–79	18–5 (5–4)	Coleman Coliseum (11,354); Tuscaloosa, AL
February 10, 2007; 7:00 p.m.	No. 18	at Ole Miss	L 69–75	18–6 (5–5)	Tad Smith Coliseum (9,452); Oxford, MS
February 14, 2007; 7:00 p.m.	No. 25	at No. 1 Florida	L 67–76	18–7 (5–6)	O'Connell Center (12,598); Gainesville, FL
February 17, 2007; 2:00 p.m.	No. 25	No. 20 Kentucky	W 72–61	19–7 (6–6)	Coleman Coliseum (15,316); Tuscaloosa, AL
February 21, 2007; 7:00 p.m.	No. 25	at Tennessee	L 66–69 ^{OT}	19–8 (6–7)	Thompson-Boling Arena (19,068); Knoxville, TN
February 24, 2007; 4:00 p.m.	No. 25	Auburn; Iron Bowl of basketball	L 77–86	19–9 (6–8)	Coleman Coliseum (15,316); Tuscaloosa, AL
February 28, 2007; 7:00 p.m.		Ole Miss	W 69–58	20–9 (7–8)	Coleman Coliseum (10,449); Tuscaloosa, AL
March 4, 2007; 1:00 p.m.		at Mississippi State	L 67–91	20–10 (7–9)	Humphrey Coliseum (9,880); Starkville, MS
SEC tournament
March 8, 2007; 12:00 p.m.	(W5)	vs. (E4) Kentucky; First Round	L 67–79	20–11	Georgia Dome; Atlanta, GA
National Invitation tournament
March 13, 2007*; 8:30 pm	(5)	at (4) UMass; First round	L 87–89 ^{OT}	20–12	Mullins Center (4,207); Amherst, Massachusetts
*Non-conference game. ^{#}Rankings from AP Poll. (#) Tournament seedings in parentheses. All times are in Central Time.

== See also ==
- 2007 NCAA Men's Division I Basketball Tournament
- 2006–07 NCAA Division I men's basketball season
- 2006–07 NCAA Division I men's basketball rankings
