= 2006 Paradise Jam =

- Season: 2006–07
- Teams: 8
- Finals site: Sports and Fitness Center, Saint Thomas, U.S. Virgin Islands
- Champions: Alabama (men's); Marquette (women's Saint John)
- MVP: Alonzo Gee, Alabama (men's); Christina Quaye, Marquette (women's Saint John)

The 2006 Paradise Jam was an early-season men's and women's college basketball tournament. The tournament, which began in 2000, was part of the 2006–07 NCAA Division I men's basketball season and 2006–07 NCAA Division I women's basketball season. The tournament was played at the Sports and Fitness Center in Saint Thomas, U.S. Virgin Islands. Alabama won the men's tournament, in the women's tournament The Championship in the Saint Thomas Division was cancelled due to a family tragedy involving an Arizona State players family member. and Marquette won the Saint John Division.

== Men's tournament ==
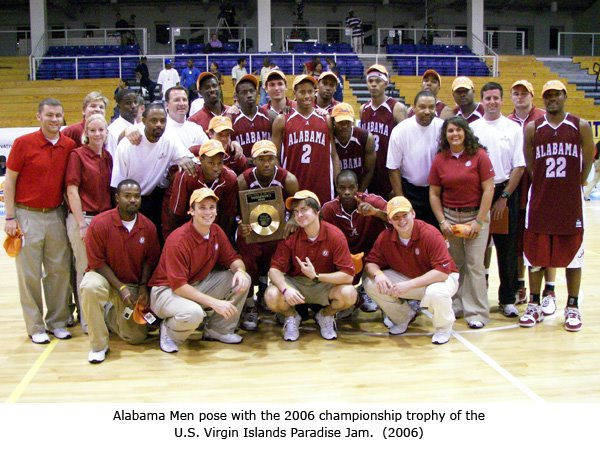
Alabama team photo 2006, Paradise Jam Tournament winner

Alabama faced Middle Tennessee in the first contest. Jermareo Davidson, the starting center for Alabama, was not with the team, due to the death of his girlfriend the prior week. Despite missing one of their top players, the Crimson Tide won 71–62. After a day off, Alabama faced Iowa. Alabama had only a one-point lead at halftime, but out scored Iowa by eleven in the second half to win 72–60. That win placed the Crimson Tide in the Championship game against Xavier, who had defeated Charleston and Villanova to also reach the finals. The game started as a repeat of the Alabama game against Iowa, with exactly the same halftime score of 32–31, Alabama outscored Xavier in the second half of the championship game and won 63–56. Alabama's Alonzo Gee was awarded Tournament MVP.

=== Bracket ===
5th Place Game; November 20
Toledo	59
VCU	60
7th Place Game
Middle Tennessee	67
College of Charleston	64

Consolation 2nd Round; November 18
Middle Tennessee	69
Toledo	75
VCU	71
College of Charleston	59

First Round; November 17
Middle Tennessee	62
10	Alabama	71
Toledo	65
Iowa	78
Xavier	70
VCU	67
College of Charleston	68
Villanova	81

Semifinals; November 18
10	Alabama	72
Iowa	60
Xavier	71
Villanova	66

Championship; November 20
8	Alabama	63
Xavier	56
3rd Place Game
Iowa	60
Villanova	89

== Women's tournament ==
Teams in the Saint Thomas division played in a 4 team tournament with a 3rd place game. Teams in the Saint John's division played a round robin, with each team playing each other on the 23rd, 24th and 25 November

=== Saint Thomas Division ===
In the opening round, Arizona State beat Western Kentucky 67–63, while Rutgers beat Penn State 57–44. Arizona State was scheduled to play Rutgers, however, due to a family tragedy involving an Arizona State players family member, the game was cancelled. Western Kentucky beat Penn State 74–64 to earn the third place.

Semifinals; November 24
Arizona State	67
Western Kentucky	63
Rutgers	57
Penn State	44

~~Championship~~; ~~November 25~~
Consolation; November 25
Western Kentucky	74
Penn State	64

=== Saint John Division ===
Finals
Western Michigan	61
Marquette	74

Finals
Auburn	64
Xavier	75

Finals
Marquette	65
Auburn	61

Finals
Xavier	69
Western Michigan	62

Finals
Xavier	53
Marquette	73
