= Shan Foster =

American basketball player (born 1986)

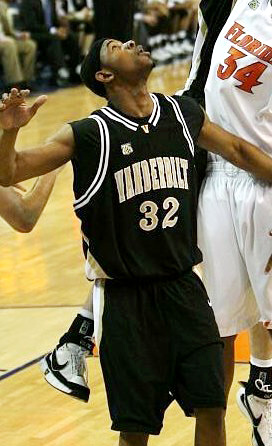
- Foster playing for Vanderbilt in 2008

Personal information
- Born: August 20, 1986 (age 40) Laurel, Mississippi, U.S.
- Listed height: 6 ft 6 in (1.98 m)
- Listed weight: 195 lb (88 kg)

Career information
- High school: Bonnabel (Kenner, Louisiana)
- College: Vanderbilt (2004–2008)
- NBA draft: 2008: 2nd round, 51st overall pick
- Drafted by: Dallas Mavericks
- Playing career: 2008–2013
- Position: Shooting guard / small forward

Career history
- 2008–2009: Eldo Caserta
- 2009–2010: Kepez Belediyesi S.K.
- 2010–2012: Dexia Mons-Hainaut
- 2012: Cañeros de La Romana
- 2012–2013: Bakersfield Jam

Career highlights
- Senior CLASS Award (2008); Consensus second-team All-American (2008); SEC Player of the Year (2008); 2× First-team All-SEC (2006, 2008); No. 32 retired by the Vanderbilt Commodores
- Stats at Basketball Reference

Shan Donte Foster (born August 20, 1986) is an American former professional basketball player. He played shooting guard for the Commodores college basketball team at Vanderbilt University. He is the school's all-time leader in both points and three-point baskets made, and is also among the Southeastern Conference's all-time leaders with consecutive games with a made three-pointer. Foster was selected as an Associated Press second team All-American for the 2007–2008 college basketball season. He was announced as the winner of the 2008 Lowe's Senior CLASS Award at the 2008 Final Four.

Foster graduated from Vanderbilt on May 9, 2008, with a degree in human and organizational development. On June 26, 2008, Foster was drafted into the NBA by the Dallas Mavericks with the 51st overall pick.

== High school career ==
Shan Foster was born in Laurel, Mississippi, and attended Bonnabel High School in Kenner, Louisiana. He served as the basketball team's captain his sophomore through senior years. While playing at Bonnabel his senior year, Foster garnered First Team All-State, All-Metro Most Valuable Player, All-City and All-District honors while averaging a double-double (23.4 points and 10 rebounds). Under Foster's leadership the Bonnabel Bruins finished an impressive 21–9 and claimed their district's title. Foster's success was not limited to the basketball court, as he also made his school's academic honor roll.

Considered a three-star recruit by Rivals.com, Foster was listed as the No. 18 small forward and the No. 82 player in the nation in 2004.

== College career ==
After picking Vanderbilt over Kansas, Notre Dame, Illinois, and LSU, Foster was immediately placed in the Commodores starting line-up. During his freshman year, Foster shot a blistering 44.5% from behind the three-point line and averaged 9.2 points a game. Foster improved his game for his sophomore year, averaging 15.9 points a game, and then 15.6 points per game as a junior. It was during his junior year that the Commodores, led by SEC Player of the Year Derrick Byars, finished the regular season a surprisingly strong 20–11 and advanced to the Sweet Sixteen before being eliminated by the Georgetown University Hoyas.

Going into his senior year, Foster was regarded as one of the deadliest long-range shooters in the NCAA and named an All-American candidate. Foster, with the help of freshman phenom A. J. Ogilvy, led the Commodores to their best start in school history at 16–0 before falling to the Kentucky Wildcats in double overtime at Rupp Arena on January 12, 2008. Foster would ensure that the loss was avenged, however, when, a month later, he scored 20 points against the Wildcats during their visit to Nashville en route to a crushing 93–52 victory that was Kentucky's worst loss since 1989, and their worst conference loss ever. Also that season, Foster would score a game-high 32 points to lead the Commodores to a 72–69 victory over the then top-ranked Tennessee Volunteers at Memorial Gymnasium. This marked the second time in Foster's career that Vanderbilt had knocked off the top-ranked team in the nation, the other instance occurring a year earlier when Vanderbilt defeated the eventual NCAA Tournament Champion Florida Gators 83–70, also at Memorial Gym.

Foster hit nine consecutive three-pointers (including a 22-footer and a 25-footer), all of which were contested, and unleashed a career-high 42 points on the visiting 25th-ranked Mississippi State Bulldogs, including the game-winning basket, to push then 16th-ranked Vanderbilt to an 86–85 overtime victory which gave the Commodores their first undefeated season at Memorial since the 1992–1993 season. The point total tied for second-highest single-game performance in Vanderbilt men's basketball history. At the conclusion of the regular season, Foster was named the 2008 SEC Player of the Year by both the SEC coaches and the Associated Press.

== College career highs ==
Foster's career highs while with the Vanderbilt Commodores are as follows:

- Points- 42 vs. Mississippi State University on March 5, 2008
- Assists- 7 at University of Kentucky on January 20, 2007
- Rebounds- 10 on 2 occasions
- Steals- 4 vs. University of Kentucky on February 25, 2007
- Blocks- 3 at Rice University on January 3, 2007
- Field Goals Made- 13 on 2 occasions
- 3-Point Field Goals Made- 9 vs. Mississippi State University on March 5, 2008
- Free Throws Made- 8 vs. University of Tennessee on February 26, 2008
- Minutes Played- 44 at University of South Carolina on February 28, 2007

== Professional career ==
Foster was drafted by Dallas Mavericks with the 51st overall pick in the 2008 NBA draft. He joined the Mavericks for the 2008 NBA Summer League. He subsequently didn't sign with the Mavericks as he later joined Juvecaserta Basket of Italy for the 2008–09 season.

He re-joined the Mavericks for the 2009 NBA Summer League. In August 2009, he signed with Kepez of Turkey for the 2009–10 season.

He again re-joined the Mavericks for the 2010 NBA Summer League. In July 2010, he signed with Dexia Mons-Hainaut of Belgium for the 2010–11 season. In 2011, he re-signed with Mons-Hainaut for the 2011–12 season. Following the conclusion of the Belgian season, he joined Caneros de La Romana of the Dominican Republic.

On June 29, 2012, Foster's rights were traded to the Utah Jazz. In November 2012, he was acquired by the Bakersfield Jam. He announced his retirement from the sport in 2013.

== Career statistics ==
=== College ===
Legend
GP	Games played	GS	Games started	MPG	Minutes per game
FG%	Field goal percentage	3P%	3-point field goal percentage	FT%	Free throw percentage
RPG	Rebounds per game	APG	Assists per game	SPG	Steals per game
BPG	Blocks per game	PPG	Points per game	**Bold**	Career high

Year	Team	GP	GS	MPG	FG%	3P%	FT%	RPG	APG	SPG	BPG	PPG
2004–05	Vanderbilt	**34**	24	22.8	.441	.445	.814	3.1	1.1	.6	.2	9.2
2005–06	Vanderbilt	30	30	32.2	.451	.415	.759	3.0	1.6	.5	.2	15.9
2006–07	Vanderbilt	**34**	**34**	32.4	.449	.346	**.843**	4.6	**2.3**	**1.2**	**.4**	15.6
2007–08	Vanderbilt	**34**	**34**	**33.7**	**.523**	**.469**	.760	**4.9**	1.6	1.1	.2	**20.3**
Career		132	122	30.2	.471	.421	.791	3.9	1.7	.8	.3	15.2

== Awards and recognition ==
- 2008 SEC Player of the Year (Consensus)
- 2008 Rivals.com First Team All America
- 2008 CBS Second Team All America
- 2008 Dickie V All Solid Gold Third Team
- 2008 Sports Illustrated Third Team All America
- 2008 Associated Press Second Team All-American
- 2008 Lowe's Senior CLASS Award Winner
- 2022 No. 32 retired by the Vanderbilt Commodores
