= 2006–07 Georgia Bulldogs basketball team =

American college basketball season

2006–07 Georgia Bulldogs men's basketball

NIT, Second Round
- Conference: Southeastern Conference
- Eastern
- Record: 19–14 (8–8 SEC)
- Head coach: Dennis Felton (4th season)
- Home arena: Stegeman Coliseum

2006–07 Southeastern Conference men's basketball standings
	Conf.				Overall
Team	W		L	PCT	W		L	PCT
East
No. 3 Florida †	13	–	3	.813	35	–	5	.875
Vanderbilt	10	–	6	.625	22	–	12	.647
No. 25 Tennessee	10	–	6	.625	24	–	11	.686
Kentucky	9	–	7	.563	22	–	12	.647
Georgia	8	–	8	.500	19	–	14	.576
South Carolina	4	–	12	.250	14	–	16	.467
West
Mississippi State	8	–	8	.500	21	–	13	.618
Ole Miss	8	–	8	.500	21	–	14	.600
Arkansas	7	–	9	.438	21	–	14	.600
Auburn	7	–	9	.438	17	–	14	.548
Alabama	7	–	9	.438	20	–	12	.625
LSU	5	–	11	.313	17	–	15	.531
† 2007 SEC tournament winner Rankings from AP Poll

The 2006–07 Georgia Bulldogs men's basketball team represented the University of Georgia during the 2006–07 NCAA Division I men's basketball season. The Bulldogs were led by fourth-year head coach Dennis Felton. They played their home games at Stegeman Coliseum as members of the Southeastern Conference. They finished the season 19–14, 8–8 in SEC play. The Bulldogs defeated Auburn in the first round of the SEC tournament to advance to the second round where they lost to Florida. They were invited to the National Invitation Tournament, where they defeated Fresno State, before losing to Air Force in the second round.

== Previous season ==
The Bulldogs finished the 2005–06 season 15–15 overall and 5–11 in SEC play. In the SEC tournament, they were defeated by Arkansas, ending their season.

== Schedule ==
Date time, TV	Rank^{#}	Opponent^{#}	Result	Record	Site (attendance) city, state
Regular season
November 10, 2006*		Southern	W 97–37	1–0	Stegeman Coliseum (5,814); Athens, GA
November 14, 2006*		Western Kentucky	L 67–70	1–1	Stegeman Coliseum (6,310); Athens, GA
November 18, 2006*		Valdosta State	W 105–74	2–1	Stegeman Coliseum (5,242); Athens, GA
November 21, 2006*		South Carolina State	W 105–60	3–1	Stegeman Coliseum (5,398); Athens, GA
November 24, 2006*		Alabama A&M	W 80–36	4–1	Stegeman Coliseum (5,719); Athens, GA
December 2, 2006*		at Wake Forest	W 87–86	5–1	LJVM Coliseum (7,491); Winston-Salem, NC
December 5, 2006*		Gardner–Webb	W 96–67	6–1	Stegeman Coliseum (5,268); Athens, GA
December 16, 2006*		vs. No. 16 Gonzaga	W 96–83	7–1	The Arena at Gwinnett Center (6,812); Duluth, GA
December 19, 2006*		Jacksonville	W 93–77	8–1	Stegeman Coliseum (5,356); Athens, GA
December 22, 2006*		at Georgia Tech; Clean, Old-Fashioned Hate	L 69–78	8–2	Alexander Memorial Coliseum (9,191); Atlanta, GA
December 28, 2006*		at No. 25 Clemson	L 60–75	8–3	Littlejohn Coliseum (9,850); Clemson, SC
December 31, 2006*		No. 4 Wisconsin	L 54–64	8–4	Stegeman Coliseum (9,804); Athens, GA
January 6, 2007		at No. 3 Florida	L 51–67	8–5 (0–1)	O'Connell Center (11,344); Gainesville, FL
January 10, 2007		South Carolina	W 80–56	9–5 (1–1)	Stegeman Coliseum (7,815); Athens, GA
January 13, 2007		Vanderbilt	W 85–73	10–5 (2–1)	Stegeman Coliseum (7,311); Athens, GA
January 17, 2007		at Arkansas	W 67–64	11–5 (3–1)	Bud Walton Arena (17,819); Fayetteville, AR
January 20, 2007		at No. 10 Alabama	L 76–78	11–6 (3–2)	Coleman Coliseum (15,316); Tuscaloosa, AL
January 24, 2007		Kentucky	W 78–69 ^{OT}	12–6 (4–2)	Stegeman Coliseum (10,523); Athens, GA
January 28, 2007		No. 21 LSU	W 57–54	13–6 (5–2)	Stegeman Coliseum (10,523); Athens, GA
January 31, 2007		at Tennessee	L 71–82	13–7 (5–3)	Thompson–Boling Arena (17,686); Knoxville, TN
February 3, 2007		at No. 24 Vanderbilt	L 61–66	13–8 (5–4)	Memorial Gymnasium (13,511); Nashville, TN
February 7, 2007		No. 1 Florida	L 61–71	13–9 (5–5)	Stegeman Coliseum (10,523); Athens, GA
February 10, 2007		at South Carolina	W 73–54	14–9 (6–5)	Colonial Life Arena (14,125); Columbia, SC
February 14, 2007*		Kennesaw State	W 75–66	15–9 (6–5)	Stegeman Coliseum (5,295); Athens, GA
February 17, 2007		Auburn	W 86–79	16–9 (7–5)	Stegeman Coliseum (10,314); Athens, GA
February 21, 2007		at Ole Miss	L 49–67	16–10 (7–6)	Tad Smith Coliseum (8,477); Oxford, MS
February 24, 2007		Mississippi State	W 86–73	17–10 (8–6)	Stegeman Coliseum (8,572); Athens, Georgia
February 28, 2007		at Kentucky	L 70–82	17–11 (8–7)	Rupp Arena (24,108); Lexington, KY
March 3, 2007		Tennessee	L 65–71	17–12 (8–8)	Stegeman Coliseum (10,230); Athens, GA
SEC tournament
March 8, 2007	(E5)	vs. (W4) Auburn; First round	W 80–65	18–12	Georgia Dome; Atlanta, GA
March 9, 2007	(E5)	vs. (E1) No. 6 Florida; Quarterfinals	L 57–74	18–13	Georgia Dome; Atlanta, GA
NIT
March 14, 2007		Fresno State; First round	W 88–78	19–13	Stegeman Coliseum (2,031); Athens, GA
March 19, 2007		at Air Force; Second round	L 52–83	19–14	Clune Arena (5,698); Colorado Springs, CO
*Non-conference game. ^{#}Rankings from AP Poll. (#) Tournament seedings in parentheses.
