= Vanderbilt Commodores men's basketball =

Men's basketball team for Vanderbilt University

2026–27 Vanderbilt Commodores men's basketball team
- University: Vanderbilt University
- First season: 1893–94; 133 years ago
- Athletic director: Candice Storey Lee
- Head coach: Mark Byington; 3rd season, 46–22 (.676)
- Location: Nashville, Tennessee
- Arena: Memorial Gymnasium (capacity: 14,316)
- NCAA division: Division I
- Conference: SEC
- Nickname: Commodores
- Colors: Black and gold
- Student section: Memorial Maniacs
- All-time record: 1,722–1,280 (.574)
- NCAA tournament record: 10–18 (.357)

NCAA Division I tournament Elite Eight
- 1965,
Other NCAA Division I tournament results
Sweet Sixteen	1965, 1974, 1988, 1993, 2004, 2007
Appearances	1965, 1974, 1988, 1989, 1991, 1993, 1997, 2004, 2007, 2008, 2010, 2011, 2012, 2016, 2017, 2025, 2026

NIT champions
- 1990

Conference tournament champions
- SoCon: 1927 SEC: 1951, 2012

Conference regular-season champions
- SIAA: 1909, 1920 SEC: 1965, 1974, 1993

Conference division champions
- SEC East: 1993

Uniforms
Home	Away	Alternate

The Vanderbilt Commodores men's basketball team represents Vanderbilt University in the Southeastern Conference (SEC)

== Memorial Gymnasium ==
The Commodores play their home games in Memorial Gymnasium. Memorial Gymnasium was built in the early 1950s. It was dedicated as the campus memorial to students and alumni killed in World War II; a plaque commemorating those who died is displayed in the gym's north lobby.

At the time of the gym's construction, there was a serious discussion within the Vanderbilt community about whether the school should de-emphasize intercollegiate athletics and refocus on its academic program. As a compromise between those who advocated increased athletics competition and those who argued in favor of de-emphasis, the gymnasium was built to hold only about 9,000 seats, and it would be readily adaptable to other uses—significantly, as a possible concert hall.

Consequently, the gymnasium floor was built up above its surroundings, more in the nature of a stage. The areas out of bounds along the sidelines were very wide, in contrast with the small facility which it replaced, where the walls were right along the sidelines and players could scrape their shoulders bringing the ball up the court. This necessitated the placement of the benches at the end of the court, which was not highly unusual at the time.

In addition, each goal was anchored by two far-reaching beams attached to support columns, with extra support coming from cables stretching all the way to the gym's ceiling. In the case of a backboard shatter or beam fracture, replacing these goals would be highly difficult, compared to the usual goal setup at most venues.

Memorial Gym is well known for its unusual design. The end-of-the-floor bench location is now unique in major college basketball, and SEC coaches who travel to Memorial, along with coaches from other schools who have played at Vanderbilt as a post-season venue, have said that the unusual setup gives Vanderbilt a tremendous home court advantage, since no other facility in which opponents play is arranged in such a way.

== Year-by-year season records ==
Season	Head coach	Overall win	Overall loss	Overall pct.	Conf. win	Conf. loss	Conf. pct.	Conf. pos.	Postseason
Southern Intercollegiate Athletic Association
1900–01	W. D. Weatherford	2	2	.500					
1901–02	W. D. Weatherford	5	2	.714					
1902–03	Grinnell Jones	6	0	1.000					
1903–04	J. Hamilton	6	1	.857					
1904–05	No team	0	0	.000					
1905–06	No scores recorded	0	0	.000					
1906–07	Stein Stone	6	1	.857					
1907–08	W. L. Throop	6	10	.375					
1908–09	Ed Hamilton	11	4	.733					SIAA Champions
1909–10	R. B McGehee	10	3	.769					
1910–11	Zeke Martin	8	2	.800					
1911–12	Carl (Zeke) Martin	9	9	.500					
1912–13	Oscar G. Nelson	3	4	.429					
1913–14	G. T. Denton	6	3	.667					
1914–15	G. T. Denton	6	6	.500					
1915–16	G. T. Denton	11	3	.786					
1916–17	G. T. Denton	3	8	.273					
1917–18	Ralph Palmer	6	3	.667					
1918–19	Ralph Palmer	8	2	.800					
1919–20	G. T. Denton	14	4	.778					SIAA Champions
1920–21	G. T. Denton	8	13	.381					
1921–22	Wallace Wade	8	8	.500					
Southern Conference
1922–23	Wallace Wade	16	8	.667	2	0	1.000		
1923–24	Josh Cody	7	15	.318	1	3	.250		
1924–25	Josh Cody	12	13	.480	4	3	.571		
1925–26	Josh Cody	8	18	.308	2	7	.222		
1926–27	Josh Cody	20	4	.833	7	1	.875		Southern Conference Tournament Champions
1927–28	Johnny (Red) Floyd	5	7	.417	2	5	.286		
1928–29	Johnny (Red) Floyd	4	12	.250	2	5	.286		
1929–30	Garland Morrow	6	16	.273	1	9	.100		
1930–31	Garland Morrow	16	8	.667	7	7	.500		
1931–32	Josh Cody	8	11	.421	5	7	.417		
Southeastern Conference
1932–33	Josh Cody	14	8	.636	11	5	.688	(3rd)	
1933–34	Josh Cody	11	6	.647	8	5	.615	(5th)	
1934–35	Josh Cody	9	11	.450	9	6	.600	(4th)	
1935–36	Josh Cody	9	14	.391	9	4	.692	(2nd)	
1936–37	Jim Buford	6	10	.375	3	7	.375	(11th)	
1937–38	Jim Buford	9	12	.429	4	8	.333	(10th)	
1938–39	Jim Buford	14	7	.667	7	5	.583	(6th)	
1939–40	Jim Buford	10	12	.455	5	7	.417	(10th)	
1940–41	Jim Buford	8	9	.471	3	9	.250	(11th)	
1941–42	Norm Cooper	7	9	.438	3	8	.273	(t-9th)	
1942–43	Norm Cooper	10	8	.556	9	7	.563	(6th)	
1943–44	Smokey Harper	12	3	.800	0	0	.000		No formal SEC schedule
1944–45	Garland Morrow	6	6	.500	0	0	.000		No formal SEC schedule
1945–46	Garland Morrow	3	10	.231	2	5	.286	(9th)	
1946–47	Norm Cooper	7	8	.467	4	7	.364	(8th)	
1947–48	Bob Polk	8	14	.364	4	11	.267	(12th)	
1948–49	Bob Polk	14	8	.636	9	5	.643	(4th)	
1949–50	Bob Polk	17	8	.680	11	3	.786	(2nd)	
1950–51	Bob Polk	19	8	.704	10	4	.714	(t-2nd)	
1951–52	Bob Polk	18	9	.667	9	5	.643	(t-2nd)	SEC Tournament Champions
1952–53	Bob Polk	10	9	.526	5	8	.385	(t-7th)	
1953–54	Bob Polk	12	10	.545	5	9	.357	(t-8th)	
1954–55	Bob Polk	16	6	.727	9	5	.643	(t-3rd)	
1955–56	Bob Polk	19	4	.826	11	3	.786	(3rd)	
1956–57	Bob Polk	17	5	.773	10	4	.714	(2nd)	
1957–58	Bob Polk	14	11	.560	7	7	.500	(7th)	
1958–59	Roy Skinner (acting)	14	10	.583	8	6	.571	(t-5th)	
1959–60	Bob Polk	14	9	.609	7	7	.500	(t-6th)	
1960–61	Bob Polk	19	5	.792	10	4	.714	(t-2nd)	
1961–62	Roy Skinner	12	12	.500	6	8	.429	(t-6th)	
1962–63	Roy Skinner	16	7	.696	9	5	.643	(4th)	
1963–64	Roy Skinner	19	6	.760	8	6	.571	(t-4th)	
1964–65	Roy Skinner	24	4	.857	15	1	.938	(1st)	NCAA Elite Eight, SEC Champions
1965–66	Roy Skinner	22	4	.846	13	3	.813	(2nd)	
1966–67	Roy Skinner	21	5	.808	14	4	.778	(t-2nd)	
1967–68	Roy Skinner	20	6	.769	12	6	.667	(3rd)	
1968–69	Roy Skinner	15	11	.577	9	9	.500	(t-5th)	
1969–70	Roy Skinner	12	14	.462	8	10	.444	(6th)	
1970–71	Roy Skinner	13	13	.500	9	9	.500	(t-4th)	
1971–72	Roy Skinner	16	10	.615	10	8	.556	(4th)	
1972–73	Roy Skinner	20	6	.769	13	5	.722	(t-2nd)	
1973–74	Roy Skinner	23	5	.821	15	3	.833	(t-1st)	NCAA Sweet 16, SEC Champions
1974–75	Roy Skinner	15	11	.577	10	8	.556	(5th)	
1975–76	Roy Skinner	16	11	.593	12	6	.667	(3rd)	
1976–77	Wayne Dobbs	10	16	.385	6	12	.333	(t-6th)	
1977–78	Wayne Dobbs	10	17	.370	6	12	.333	(8th)	
1978–79	Wayne Dobbs	18	9	.667	11	7	.611	(t-3rd)	
1979–80	Richard Schmidt	13	13	.500	7	11	.389	(t-6th)	
1980–81	Richard Schmidt	15	14	.517	7	11	.389	(7th)	
1981–82	C. M. Newton	15	13	.536	7	11	.389	(t-7th)	
1982–83	C. M. Newton	19	14	.576	9	9	.500	(t-4th)	NIT Second Round
1983–84	C. M. Newton	14	15	.483	8	10	.444	(t-7th)	
1984–85	C. M. Newton	11	17	.393	4	14	.222	(10th)	
1985–86	C. M. Newton	13	15	.464	7	11	(.389	7th)	
1986–87	C. M. Newton	18	16	.529	7	11	(.389	t-8th)	NIT Quarterfinals
1987–88	C. M. Newton	20	11	.645	10	8	.556	(t-4th)	NCAA Sweet 16
1988–89	C. M. Newton	19	14	.576	12	6	.667	(t-2nd)	NCAA First Round
1989–90	Eddie Fogler	21	14	.600	7	11	.389	(t-7th)	NIT Champions
1990–91	Eddie Fogler	17	13	.567	11	7	.611	(4th)	NCAA First Round
Southeastern Conference (Eastern Division)
1991–92	Eddie Fogler	15	15	.500	6	10	.375	(5th)	NIT First Round
1992–93	Eddie Fogler	28	6	.824	14	2	.875	(1st)	NCAA Sweet 16, SEC Champions
1993–94	Jan van Breda Kolff	20	12	.625	9	7	.563	(3rd)	NIT Runners-up
1994–95	Jan van Breda Kolff	13	15	.464	6	10	.375	(4th)	
1995–96	Jan van Breda Kolff	18	14	.563	7	9	.563	(4th)	NIT Second Round
1996–97	Jan van Breda Kolff	19	12	.613	9	7	.563	(4th)	NCAA First Round
1997–98	Jan van Breda Kolff	20	13	.606	7	9	.438	(t-4th)	NIT Quarterfinals
1998–99	Jan van Breda Kolff	14	15	.483	5	11	.313	(5th)	
1999–2000	Kevin Stallings	19	11	.633	8	8	.500	(4th)	NIT First Round
2000–01	Kevin Stallings	15	15	.500	4	12	.250	(6th)	
2001–02	Kevin Stallings	17	15	.531	6	10	.375	(t-5th)	NIT Second Round
2002–03	Kevin Stallings	11	18	.379	3	13	.188	(6th)	
2003–04	Kevin Stallings	23	10	.697	8	8	.500	(t-3rd)	NCAA Sweet 16
2004–05	Kevin Stallings	20	14	.588	8	8	.500	(3rd)	NIT Quarterfinals
2005–06	Kevin Stallings	17	13	.567	7	9	.438	(4th)	NIT First Round
2006–07	Kevin Stallings	22	12	.647	10	6	.625	(2nd)	NCAA Sweet 16
2007–08	Kevin Stallings	26	8	.765	10	6	.625	(3rd)	NCAA First Round
2008–09	Kevin Stallings	19	12	.613	8	8	.500	(t-4th)	
2009–10	Kevin Stallings	24	9	.727	12	4	.750	(2nd)	NCAA First Round
2010–11	Kevin Stallings	23	11	.676	9	7	.563	(3rd)	NCAA Second Round
Southeastern Conference
2011–12	Kevin Stallings	25	11	.694	10	6	.625	(t-2nd)	SEC Tournament Champions, NCAA Third Round
2012–13	Kevin Stallings	16	17	.485	8	10	.444	(10th)	
2013–14	Kevin Stallings	15	15	.500	7	11	.389	(t-10th)	
2014–15	Kevin Stallings	21	14	.600	9	9	.500	(7th)	NIT Quarterfinals
2015–16	Kevin Stallings	19	14	.576	11	7	.611	(7th)	NCAA First Four
2016–17	Bryce Drew	19	16	.543	10	8	.556	(t-5th)	NCAA Second Round
2017–18	Bryce Drew	12	20	.375	6	12	.333	(13th)	
2018–19	Bryce Drew	9	23	.281	0	18	.000	(14th)	
2019–20	Jerry Stackhouse	11	20	.355	3	15	.167	(14th)	
2020–21	Jerry Stackhouse	9	16	.360	3	13	.188	(14th)	
2021–22	Jerry Stackhouse	19	17	.528	7	11	.389	(11th)	NIT Quarterfinals
2022–23	Jerry Stackhouse	22	15	.595	11	7	.611	(T-4th)	NIT Quarterfinals
2023–24	Jerry Stackhouse	9	23	.281	4	14	.222	(13th)	
2024–25	Mark Byington	20	13	.606	8	10	.444	(T-8th)	NCAA Second Round
Total overall record		1,696	1,269	.572	760	768	.497		16 NCAA Appearances, 14 NIT Appearances, 8 Conference Championships
SEC record		1,452	1,069	.576	727	721	.502		16 NCAA Appearances, 14 NIT Appearances, 2 SEC Tournament Championships, 3 SEC Regular Season Championships
SoCon record		102	112	.477	33	47	.413		1 SoCon Tournament Champions
SIAA record		142	88	.617	0	0	.000		2 SIAA Championships

Note: Fansonly.com reports Vanderbilt's overall record in 1937–38 as 9–12, while SECSports.com reports it as 10–11.

Source: Soconsports.com

Source: SECSports.com

Source: Fansonly.com

=== Vanderbilt coaching record ===
Season	Head coach	Overall win	Overall loss	Overall pct.	Conf. win	Conf. loss	Conf. pct.	Postseason NIT/NCAA
1	Mark Byington	20	13	.606	8	10	.444	1 NCAA
4	Jerry Stackhouse	61	69	.469	24	46	.343	2 NIT
3	Bryce Drew	40	59	.404	16	38	.296	1 NCAA
17	Kevin Stallings	332	219	.603	138	142	.493	5 NIT, 7 NCAA, 1 SEC Tournament Championship
6	Jan van Breda Kolff	104	81	.562	43	53	.448	3 NIT, 1 NCAA
4	Eddie Fogler	81	48	.628	38	30	.559	2 NIT (1 NIT Championship), 2 NCAA, 1 SEC Championship
8	C. M. Newton	129	115	.529	64	80	.444	2 NIT, 2 NCAA
2	Richard Schmidt	28	27	.509	14	22	.389	
3	Wayne Dobbs	38	42	.475	23	31	.426	
16	Roy Skinner	278	135	.673	171	97	.638	2 NCAA, 2 SEC Championships
13	Bob Polk	197	106	.650	107	75	.588	1 SEC Tournament Championship
1	Smokey Harper	12	3	.857	0	0	.000	
3	Norm Cooper	24	25	.490	16	22	.421	
5	Jim Buford	47	50	.485	22	36	.379	
4	Garland "Gus" Morrow	31	40	.437	10	21	.323	
2	Johnny (Red) Floyd	9	19	.321	4	10	.286	
9	Josh Cody	98	100	.495	56	41	.577	1 Southern Conference Tournament Championship
2	Wallace Wade	24	16	.600	2	0	1.000	
1	Ray Morrison	8	2	.800	0	0	.000	
2	Ralph Palmer	14	5	.737	0	0	.000	
6	G. T. Denton	26	20	.565	0	0	.000	1 SIAA Championship
1	Oscar G. Nelson	3	4	.429	0	0	.000	
2	Carl (Zeke) Martin	17	11	.607	0	0	.000	
1	R. B McGehee	10	3	.769	0	0	.000	
1	W. L. Throop	6	10	.375	0	0	.000	
1	J. N. (Stein) Stone	6	1	.857	0	0	.000	
2	E. J. Hamilton	17	5	.773	0	0	.000	1 SIAA Championship
1	Grinnell Jones	6	0	1.000	0	0	.000	
2	W. D. Weatherford	7	4	.636	0	0	.000	

== Conference affiliations ==
Vanderbilt has been affiliated with the following conferences.

- Independent (1890–1891)
- SIAA (1892–1921)
- Southern Conference (1922–1932)
- Southeastern Conference (1933–present)

== Conference championships ==
Vanderbilt has won five conference season championships, three conference tournament championships, and one division season championship. The Commodores have won eight conference championships in total.

Year	Conference	Coach	Overall record	Conference record
1909	SIAA Season Championship	E. J. Hamilton	11-4	5-0
1920	SIAA Season Championship	G. T. Denton	14-4	6-0
1927	Southern Tournament Championship	Josh Cody	20-4	7-1
1951	SEC Tournament Championship	Bob Polk	18-9	9-5
1965	SEC Season Championship	Roy Skinner	24-4	15-1
1974	SEC Season Championship	Roy Skinner	23-5	15-3
1993	SEC Season Championship; SEC East Division Championship	Eddie Fogler	28-6	14-2
2012	SEC Tournament Championship	Kevin Stallings	25-11	10-6

== First college basketball game played ==
Vanderbilt defeated Nashville YMCA in a score of 9-6, on 7 February 1893, in the first college basketball game played in history. Vanderbilt's start to college basketball occurred just two years after Dr. James Naismith originated the game of basketball at Springfield (Mass.) College.

== Retired numbers ==
Only three male Commodores have had their jerseys retired by the university:

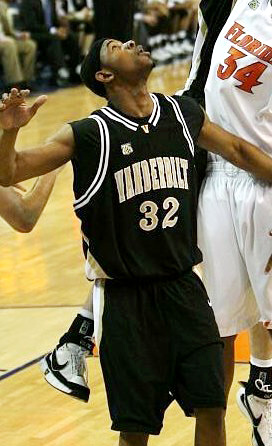
Shan Foster's #32, retired by Vanderbilt

No.	Player	Pos.	Career	Ref.
25	Perry Wallace	SF	1967–70	
32	Shan Foster	SG, SF	2004–08	
43	Clyde Lee	PF, C	1964–66	

- Clyde Lee was perhaps the greatest player in Commodore history. He averaged the most points per game in school history and the balconies on the south end of Memorial Gymnasium are commonly referred to as the "balconies that Clyde built".
- Perry Wallace was the first African-American basketball player in the Southeastern Conference, and the first African American to compete in the SEC for his entire period of athletic eligibility. (Note: Contrary to often-stated belief, Wallace was not the first African American to play an SEC sport. The first African American to play in the SEC was Stephen Martin, who walked on to the Tulane baseball team in the 1966 season, the school year before Wallace enrolled at Vanderbilt. Martin is often ignored as an SEC integration pioneer because Tulane left the SEC immediately after the 1966 baseball season. Wallace was also not the first black scholarship athlete to play in the SEC, although this was only because the football season precedes the basketball season within the school year. At the same time that Wallace enrolled at Vanderbilt, Kentucky enrolled two African Americans on football scholarships, Nate Northington and Greg Page. Page suffered a spinal cord injury before playing in a varsity game and died from the complications on September 29, 1967; Northington played in Kentucky's first two games of the 1967 season, first at Indiana on September 23 and then against Ole Miss at home on September 30 (he did not play again for the Wildcats, transferring to Western Kentucky after that season).)

== Postseason ==
=== NCAA tournament results ===
The Commodores have appeared in the NCAA tournament 17 times. Their combined record is 11–18.

Year	Seed	Round	Opponent	Result
1965		Sweet Sixteen; Elite Eight	DePaul; Michigan	W 83–78 ^{OT} L 85–87
1974		Sweet Sixteen; Regional 3rd Place Game	Marquette; Notre Dame	L 61–69; L 88–118
1988	#7	Round of 64; Round of 32; Sweet Sixteen	#10 Utah State #2 Pittsburgh #6 Kansas	W 80–77; W 80–74 ^{OT} L 64–77
1989	#8	Round of 64	#9 Notre Dame	L 65–81
1991	#9	Round of 64	#8 Georgetown	L 60–70
1993	#3	Round of 64; Round of 32; Sweet Sixteen	#14 Boise State #6 Illinois #7 Temple	W 92–72; W 85–68; L 59–67
1997	#7	Round of 64	#10 Xavier	L 68–80
2004	#6	Round of 64; Round of 32; Sweet Sixteen	#11 Western Michigan #3 NC State #2 Connecticut	W 71–58; W 75–73; L 53–73
2007	#6	Round of 64; Round of 32; Sweet Sixteen	#11 George Washington #3 Washington State #2 Georgetown	W 77–44; W 78–74 ^{2OT} L 65–66
2008	#4	Round of 64	#13 Siena	L 62–83
2010	#4	Round of 64	#13 Murray State	L 65–66
2011	#5	Round of 64	#12 Richmond	L 66–69
2012	#5	Round of 64; Round of 32	#12 Harvard #4 Wisconsin	W 79–70; L 57–60
2016	#11	First Four	#11 Wichita State	L 50–70
2017	#9	Round of 64	#8 Northwestern	L 66–68
2025	#10	Round of 64	#7 Saint Mary's	L 56–59
2026	#5	Round of 64; Round of 32	#12 McNeese #4 Nebraska	W 78–68; L 72–74

=== NIT results ===
The Commodores have appeared in the National Invitation Tournament (NIT) 14 times. Their combined record is 24–13. They were NIT champions in 1990.

Year	Round	Opponent	Result
1983	First Round; Second Round	East Tennessee State; Wake Forest	W 79–73; L 68–75
1987	First Round; Second Round; Quarterfinals	Jacksonville; Florida State; Southern Miss	W 74–72; W 109–92; L 88–95
1990	First Round; Second Round; Quarterfinals; Semifinals; Championship Game	Louisiana Tech; Tennessee; New Orleans; Penn State; Saint Louis	W 98–90; W 89–85; W 88–85; W 75–62; W 74–72
1992	First Round	Rhode Island	L 63–68
1994	First Round; Second Round; Quarterfinals; Semifinals; Championship Game	Oklahoma; New Orleans; Clemson; Kansas State; Villanova	W 77–67; W 78–59; W 89–74; W 82–76; L 73–80
1996	First Round; Second Round	Arkansas–Little Rock; South Carolina	W 86–80; L 70–80
1998	First Round; Second Round; Quarterfinals	St. Bonaventure; Wake Forest; Georgia	W 73–61; W 72–68; L 65–79
2000	First Round	Wake Forest	L 68–83
2002	Opening Round; First Round	Houston; Louisiana Tech	W 59–50; L 68–83
2005	First Round; Second Round; Quarterfinals	Indiana; Wichita State; Memphis	W 67–60; W 65–63; L 68–81
2006	First Round	Notre Dame	L 69–79
2015	First Round; Second Round; Quarterfinals	Saint Mary's; South Dakota State; Stanford	W 75–64; W 92–77; L 75–78
2022	First Round; Second Round; Quarterfinals	Belmont; Dayton; Xavier	W 82–71; W 70–68^{OT} L 73–75
2023	First Round; Second Round; Quarterfinals	Yale; Michigan; UAB	W 71–62; W 66–65; L 59–67

== All-Americans ==
Player	Years
John Jenkins	2012
Shan Foster	2008
Dan Langhi	2000
Billy McCaffrey	1993, 1994
Will Perdue	1988
Tom Hagan	1969
Clyde Lee	1965, 1966
Billy Joe Adcock	1950

Source: Vucommodores.com

== SEC Players of the Year ==
Player	Years
Shan Foster	2008 (consensus)
Derrick Byars	2007 (SEC coaches)
Dan Langhi	2000 (consensus, but shared AP award)
Billy McCaffrey	1993 (shared AP award)
Will Perdue	1988 (consensus)
Jan van Breda Kolff	1974 (consensus)
Clyde Lee	1965 (consensus), 1966 (UPI)

Source: Vucommodores.com

== Academic All-Americans ==
Player	Years
Jeff Fosnes	1975, 1976
Bruce Elder	1993

== Olympians ==
- Jeff Turner- won the gold medal in men's basketball as a member of Team USA at the 1984 Summer Olympics in Los Angeles.

== Other notable alumni ==
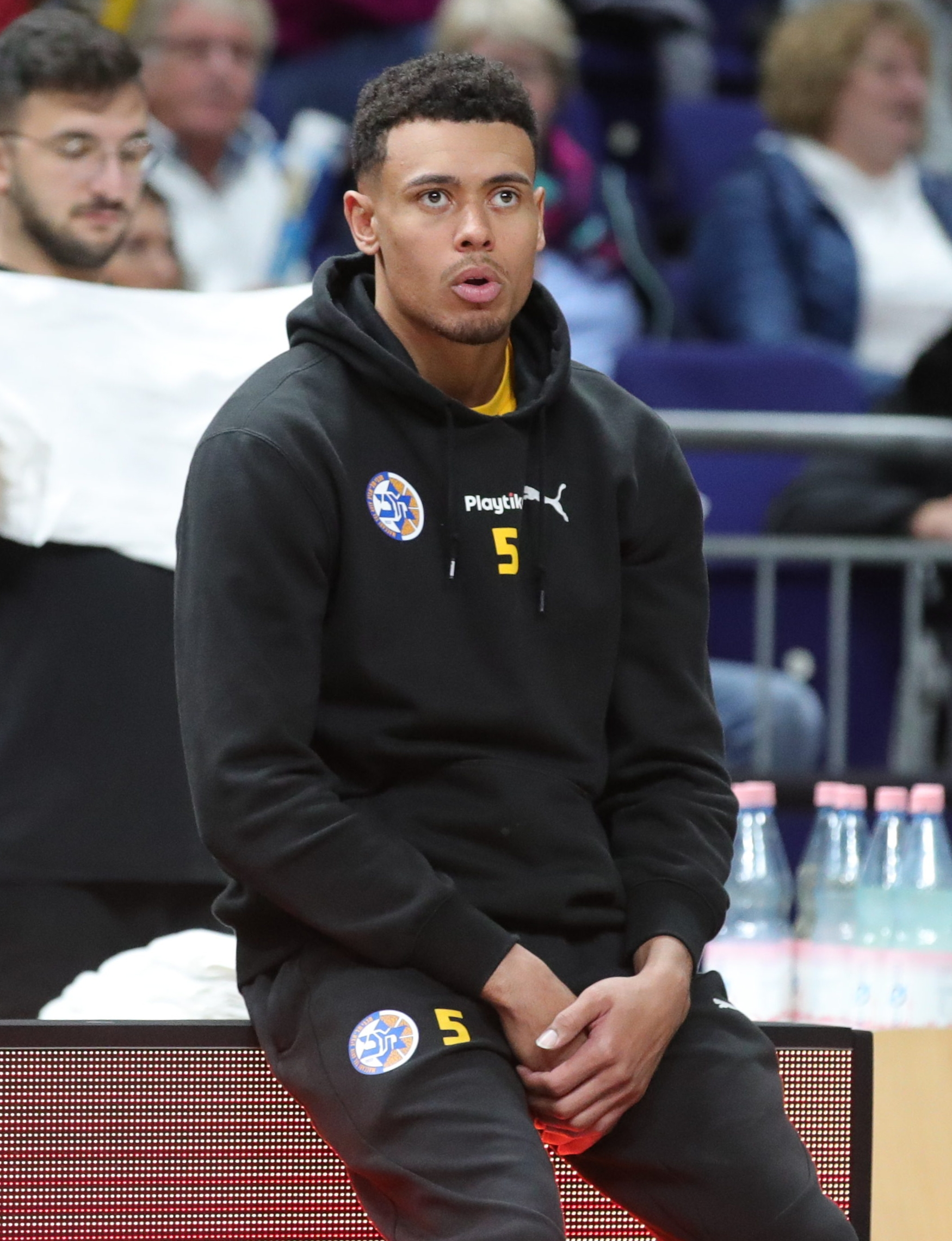
Wade Baldwin IV

- Wade Baldwin IV (born 1996), player for Fenerbahçe S.K. (basketball) of the EuroLeague
- Darius Garland (born 2000), player for the Cleveland Cavaliers; NBA All-Star (2022)
- Luke Kornet (born 1995), player for the San Antonio Spurs; won the 2024 NBA Finals with the Boston Celtics
- Saben Lee (born 1999), player for Olympiacos B.C. of the Greek Basketball League
- Aaron Nesmith (born 1999), player for the Indiana Pacers
- Simisola Shittu (born 1999), British-born Canadian player for Ironi Ness Ziona of the Israeli Basketball Premier League
- Payton Willis (born 1998), player in the Israeli Basketball Premier League

== Vanderbilt alums coaching in college basketball ==
- James Strong – Class of 2000, currently at Vanderbilt University
- Martin Bahar – Class of 2006, currently at The University of San Diego
- Darshawn McClellan - Class of 2011, currently at University of Texas at El Paso
- Sam Ferry - Class of 2010, currently at College of the Holy Cross

== Coaching awards ==
- Jerry Stackhouse — SEC Coach of the Year 2023 and Ben Jobe National Minority Coach of the Year 2023
- Kevin Stallings – SEC Coach of the Year 2007 and 2010
- Eddie Fogler – 1993 National Coach of the Year by AP, UPI, CBS, USBWA, Scripps-Howard, Sports Illustrated, Sporting News, Basketball Weekly
- C. M. Newton – SEC Coach of the Year, 1988 and 1989
- Wayne Dobbs – SEC Coach of the Year, 1979
- Roy Skinner – SEC Coach of the Year, 1965, 1967, 1974, and 1976

== All-time leaders ==
Totals current as of March 15, 2012.

=== Points ===
Rank	Player	Career Points
1	Shan Foster (2005–2008)	2,011
2	Jeffery Taylor (2009–2012)	1,897
3	Matt Freije (2001–2004)	1,891
4	Phil Cox (1982–85)	1,724
5	Ronnie McMahan (1992–95)	1,719

=== Points per game (min 50 games) ===
Rank	Player	Career PPG
1	Clyde Lee (1964–66)	21.4
2	Billy McCaffrey (1993–94)	20.6
3	Tom Hagan (1967–69)	19.9
4	Jim Henry (1957–59)	17.6
5	John Jenkins (2009–12)	16.9

=== Rebounds ===
Rank	Player	Career Rebounds
1	Clyde Lee (1964–66)	1,223
2	Perry Wallace (1968–70)	894
3	Bobby Thym (1954–57)	872
4	Bob "Snake" Grace (1963–65)	837
5	Charley Harrison (1953–56)	802

=== Assists ===
Rank	Player	Career Assists
1	Atiba Prater (1996-00)	517
2	Brad Tinsley (2008–12)	482
3	Frank Seckar (1993–96)	455
4	Kevin Anglin (1990–93)	435
5	Jan van Breda Kolff (1972–74)	430

=== Steals ===
Rank	Player	Career Steals
1	Drew Maddux (1994–98)	214
1	Frank Seckar (1993–96)	214
3	Atiba Prater (1996-00)	211
4	James Strong (1996-00)	209
5	Kevin Anglin (1990–93)	192

=== Blocks ===
Rank	Player	Career Blocks
1	Luke Kornet (2013–17)	210
2	Festus Ezeli (2008–12)	204
3	Damian Jones (2013–16)	167
4	Will Perdue (1984, 1986–88)	157
5	A.J. Ogilvy (2008–10)	145

Source: 2015–16 Vanderbilt Commodores Media Guide
