= 1958–59 Georgetown Hoyas men's basketball team =

American college basketball season

1958–59 Georgetown Hoyas men's basketball
- Conference: Independent
- Record: 8–15
- Head coach: Tom Nolan (3rd season)
- Assistant coach: Tommy O'Keefe (3rd season)
- Captain: Jim Oravec
- Home arena: McDonough Gymnasium

The 1958–59 Georgetown Hoyas men's basketball team represented Georgetown University during the 1958–59 NCAA University Division college basketball season. Tom Nolan coached them in his third season as head coach. The team was an independent and played its home games at McDonough Gymnasium on the Georgetown campus in Washington, D.C. It finished with a record of 8–15 and had no post-season play.

== Season recap ==
The 1958–1959 season saw the beginning of an annual series between Georgetown and Boston College that would continue through the 2004–2005 season, after which the rivalry between the schools came to end with the departure of Boston College from the Big East Conference.

The 1958–1959 Georgetown team was undersized — averaging 6-feet-1 (185 cm) in height and with no player taller than 6-foot-4 (193 cm) — and inexperienced, with only one senior on the roster. Diminutive sophomore guard Brian "Puddy" Sheehan, the team's 5-foot-9 (175 cm) point guard, who was an expert ballhandler and a dominant player throughout his college career, emerged as the team's top scorer, averaging 18.4 points per game despite being the smallest man on the court. In his debut, he scored 30 points – a school record for points scored in a debut game – and he turned in a 25-point performance against Connecticut, 23 against Boston College, and 22 in a win over Syracuse. He scored only nine points in one of the games against Maryland, but he scored in double figures in every other game.

Sophomore center Tom Coleman also joined the varsity from the freshman team this year as its tallest player at 6-foot-4 (193 cm). He led the team in rebounding and scored 22 points in an upset of Loyola of Chicago and 31 against George Washington.

Another player to join the varsity from the freshman team was sophomore forward Tom Matan, and he probably had his most productive season this year. Able to play forward and center, he was an effective inside scorer, averaging 14.3 points per game this season, with 30 points in the upset of Loyola of Chicago, 27 against Loyola of Maryland, and 26 against Seton Hall.

Among four players suspended for the year partway through the previous season because of their grades, junior forward Tom McCloskey was the only one of the four to return to the team this season. He scored in double figures in 15 games, had 17 points in the upset of Loyola of Chicago and 20 in the win over Syracuse. He and junior guard Dick Razzetti both opted not to return to the varsity team the following season and instead play intramural basketball – leading their team to the 1960 intramural title – while McCloskey focused on his studies.

Young, inexperienced, always playing against larger and stronger players, and with 15 of their 23 games on the road, the undersized 1958–1959 Hoyas lost 10 of their last 13 games, concluding the season with seven straight losses. They struggled to an 8-15 finish, the worst record of Tom Nolan's four-year coaching tenure and worst by a Georgetown team since the 1934–35 season. The team had no post-season play, and was not ranked in the Top 20 in the Associated Press Poll or Coaches' Poll at any time.

== Roster ==
Beginning this season and continuing through the 1967–68 season, Georgetown players wore even-numbered jerseys for home games and odd-numbered ones for away games; for example, a player would wear No. 10 at home and No. 11 on the road. Players are listed below by the even numbers they wore at home.

Junior guard Ed Hargaden Jr., was the first second-generation Georgetown men's basketball player, his father, guard Ed Hargaden, having been a standout on the 1932–-33, 1933–34, and 1934–35 teams. He also was the only second-generation player in school history until center Patrick Ewing's son, forward Patrick Ewing Jr., joined the team in the 2006–07 season.

#	Name	Height	Weight (lbs.)	Position	Class	Hometown	Previous Team(s)
10	Brian Sheehan	5"10"	155	G	So.	Silver Spring, MD, U.S.	St. John's College HS (Washington, DC)
12	Ray Ohlmuller	6"4"	N/A	G	So.	West Englewood, NJ, U.S.	Regis HS (New York, NY)
14	Tom Matan	6'3"	N/A	F	So.	Chevy Chase, MD, U.S.	Gonzaga College HS (Washington, DC)
20	Jim Oravec	6"2"	N/A	G	Sr.	Palmerton, PA, U.S.	Palmerton HS
22	Ed Hargaden Jr.	6"0"	N/A	G	Jr.	Baltimore, MD, U.S.	Loyola HS
24	Tom McCloskey	6'1"	178	F	Jr.	Washington, DC, U.S.	Gonzaga College HS
30	John Philbin	6'1"	N/A	G	So.	Clinton, MA, U.S.	Portsmouth Priory School
34	Tom Fitzpatrick	6'3"	N/A	F	So.	Washington, DC, U.S.	St. John's College HS
40	Dick Razzetti	6'3"	N/A	G	Jr.	Westbury, NY, U.S.	Chaminade HS
44	Tom Coleman	6'4"	205	C	So.	Silver Spring, MD, U.S.	Gonzaga College HS (Washington, DC)

== 1958–59 schedule and results ==
Date time, TV	Rank^{#}	Opponent^{#}	Result	Record	Site city, state
Regular Season
Thu., Dec. 4, 1958 no, no		Kentucky Wesleyan	W 93–73	1-0	McDonough Gymnasium; Washington, DC
Sat., Dec. 6, 1958 no, no		at Mount St. Mary's	W 85–76	2-0	Alumni Gymnasium; Emmitsburg, MD
Wed., Dec. 10, 1958 no, no		at Loyola Maryland	W 83–73	3-0	Alumni Gymnasium; Baltimore, MD
Sat., Dec. 13, 1958 no, no		George Washington	L 75–82	3-1	McDonough Gymnasium; Washington, DC
Fri., Dec. 19, 1958 no, no		at New York Athletic Club	W 79–70	exhibition	New York Athletic Club Gymnasium; New York, NY
Sat., Dec. 20, 1958 no, no		at Saint Peter's	L 63–66	3-2	Jersey City Armory; Jersey City, NJ
Mon., Dec. 22, 1958 no, no		at Connecticut; Rivalry	L 68–76	3-3	University of Connecticut Field House; Storrs, CT
Mon., Dec. 29, 1958 no, no		vs. Penn State; Richmond Invitational Tournament	L 74–88	3-4	Richmond Arena; Richmond, VA
Tue., Dec. 30, 1958 no, no		vs. Columbia; Richmond Invitational Tournament	W 101–77	4-4	Richmond Arena; Richmond, VA
Wed., Jan. 7, 1959 no, no		vs. American	L 67–92	4-5	Fort Myer Gymnasium; Fort Myer, VA
Sat., Jan. 10, 1959 no, no		Boston College	W 76–69	5-5	McDonough Gymnasium; Washington, DC
Wed., Jan. 14, 1959 no, no		at Maryland	L 53–61	5-6	Cole Field House; College Park, MD
Sat., Jan. 17, 1959 no, no		at George Washington	L 72–85	5-7	Fort Myer Gymnasium; Fort Myer, VA
Wed., Jan. 28, 1959 no, no		at Xavier	L 62–70	5-8	Schmidt Field House; Cincinnati, OH
Fri., Jan. 30, 1959 no, no		at Loyola Chicago	W 103–93	6-8	Alumni Gymnasium; Chicago, IL
Wed., Feb. 4, 1959 no, no		Syracuse; Rivalry	W 85–70	7-8	McDonough Gymnasium; Washington, DC
Sat., Feb. 7, 1959 no, no		Fordham	W 79–70	8-8	McDonough Gymnasium; Washington, DC
Wed., Feb. 11, 1959 no, no		La Salle	L 72–102	8-9	McDonough Gymnasium; Washington, DC
Fri., Feb. 13, 1959 no, no		at Muhlenberg	L 81–85	8-10	Memorial Hall; Allentown, PA
Sat., Feb. 14, 1959 no, no		vs. Lafayette	L 94–109	8-11	Alumni Gymnasium; Baltimore, MD
Wed., Feb. 18, 1959 no, no		at Navy	L 47–72	8-12	Halsey Field House; Annapolis, MD
Sat., Feb. 21, 1959 no, no		Seton Hall	L 83–89	8-13	McDonough Gymnasium; Washington, DC
Wed., Feb. 25, 1959 no, no		Maryland	L 56–67	8-14	McDonough Gymnasium; Washington, DC
Fri., Feb. 27, 1959 no, no		at No. 14 St. Joseph's	L 80–98	8-15	Palestra; Philadelphia, PA
*Non-conference game. ^{#}Rankings from AP Poll. (#) Tournament seedings in parentheses.
