= 1959–60 Georgetown Hoyas men's basketball team =

American college basketball season

1959–60 Georgetown Hoyas men's basketball
- Conference: Independent
- Record: 11–12
- Head coach: Tom Nolan (4th season)
- Assistant coach: Tommy O'Keefe (4th season)
- Captain: Ed Hargeden Jr.
- Home arena: McDonough Gymnasium

The 1959–60 Georgetown Hoyas men's basketball team represented Georgetown University during the 1959–60 NCAA University Division college basketball season. Tom Nolan coached them in his fourth and final season as head coach. The team was an independent and played its home games at McDonough Gymnasium on the Georgetown campus in Washington, D.C. The team finished with a record of 11–12 and had no post-season play.

== Season recap ==
Diminutive junior guard Brian "Puddy" Sheehan, the team's point guard and a dominant player throughout his college career, had emerged the previous season as Georgetown's top scorer on an undersized team. He continued as such this season among taller teammates, averaging 21.3 points per game in his first six games, including a 29-point performance against Saint Peter's and 27 against Niagara. In the ninth game of the year, he scored 23 points against Providence in the championship game of the Providence Invitational Tournament. Despite usually playing against opponents who were six inches (15 cm) taller, he was Georgetown's top scorer for the second straight year, averaging 15.6 points per game for the season.

Either Sheehan or junior center Tom Coleman led the team in scoring in 15 games. In addition to providing a strong defensive presence, Coleman scored in double figures ten times, with 24 against Fordham and a season-high 26 versus Boston College.

Sophomore guard Jim Carrino joined the varsity team this year after a season on the freshman team. As reserve during the year, he nonetheless provided welcome assistance to Sheehan in the backcourt, coming off the bench to average 12.2 points per game and score in 12 games, including 18 points against Brown, 24 against Fordham, and 26 against Boston College. An injury cut his season short and he appeared in only 15 games, but his performance earned him a starting spot on the next year's team.

Sophomore forward Paul "Tag" Tagliabue also joined the varsity team this season after a year on the freshman team. He scored in double figures in eight of his last ten games and demonstrated a willingness to fight for rebounds under the basket; he led the Hoyas in rebounding for the season, and, as a three-year starter, was destined to become one of the top rebounders in school history.

Another sophomore, center Bob Sharpenter, had been a high school standout and a top scorer on the freshman team the previous season, but he struggled with the transition to the varsity this year. Playing in only 12 games, he averaged only 4.5 points per game and shot only 34% from the field, and also showed defensive weaknesses. He would correct his shooting and defense the following season, and by his senior year would emerge as one of Georgetown's great players.

Junior forward Tom Matan had been a standout the previous season, but with taller players like Tagliabue and Sharpenter now on the team, he moved to a swing role in which he was not as productive. Nonetheless, he scored in double figures six times and had a season-high 21 points against Fairfield.

The 1959-60 team finished with a record of 11–12 and had no post-season play. The last Georgetown men's basketball team with a losing record until the 1967-68 season, it was not ranked in the Top 20 in the Associated Press Poll or Coaches' Poll at any time.

Nolan left the head coaching position after the end of the season to focus on coaching the Georgetown baseball team, which he did through the 1978 season. He departed with a 40–49 record during his four-season tenure, with no winning seasons and no post-season tournament appearances. Georgetown hired assistant coach and former Georgetown and National Basketball Association (NBA) player Tommy O'Keefe as his replacement.

== Roster ==
From the 1958–59 season through the 1967–68 season, Georgetown players wore even-numbered jerseys for home games and odd-numbered ones for away games; for example, a player would wear No. 10 at home and No. 11 on the road. Players are listed below by the even numbers they wore at home.

Senior guard and team captain Ed Hargaden Jr., was the first second-generation Georgetown men's basketball player, his father, guard Ed Hargaden, having been a standout on the 1932–33, 1933–34, and 1934–35 teams. He also was the only second-generation player in school history until center Patrick Ewing's son, forward Patrick Ewing Jr., joined the team in the 2006–07 season.

Sophomore forward Paul Tagliabue later became Commissioner of the National Football League.

#	Name	Height	Weight (lbs.)	Position	Class	Hometown	Previous Team(s)
10	Brian Sheehan	5"10"	155	G	Jr.	Silver Spring, MD, U.S.	St. John's College HS (Washington, DC)
12	Ray Ohlmuller	6"4"	N/A	G	Jr.	West Englewood, NJ, U.S.	Regis HS (New York, NY)
14	Jay Force	6'0"	N/A	G	So.	West Orange, NJ, U.S.	West Orange HS
20	Tom O'Dea	6"3"	N/A	G	So.	Westwood, NJ, U.S.	Saint Cecelia School
22	Ed Hargaden Jr.	6"0"	N/A	G	Sr.	Baltimore, MD, U.S.	Loyola HS
24	Tom Fitzpatrick	6'3"	N/A	F	Jr.	Washington, DC, U.S.	St. John's College HS
32	Paul Tagliabue	6'5"	200	F	So.	Jersey City, NJ, U.S.	Saint Michael's School
34	Vince Wolfington	6"4"	N/A	F	Sr.	Haverford, PA, U.S.	Malvern Preparatory School
40	Tom Matan	6'3"	N/A	F	Jr.	Chevy Chase, MD, U.S.	Gonzaga College HS (Washington, DC)
42	Jim Carrino	6'3"	190	G	So.	New York, NY, U.S.	Archbishop Molloy HS
44	Tom Coleman	6'4"	205	C	Jr.	Silver Spring, MD, U.S.	Gonzaga College HS (Washington, DC)
50	John Kraljic	6'4"	N/A	F	So.	New York, NY, U.S.	Bishop Dubois HS
52	Dan Slattery	6'4"	N/A	F	So.	Washington, DC, U.S.	Gonzaga College HS
54	Bob Sharpenter	6'7"	230	C	So.	Aurora, IL, U.S.	Marmion Military Academy

== 1959–60 schedule and results ==
Date time, TV	Rank^{#}	Opponent^{#}	Result	Record	Site city, state
Regular Season
Wed., Dec. 2, 1959 no, no		Mount St. Mary's	W 81–73	1-0	McDonough Gymnasium; Washington, DC
Sat., Dec. 5, 1959 no, no		New York University	L 48–70	1-1	McDonough Gymnasium; Washington, DC
Wed., Dec. 9, 1959 no, no		American	L 60–65	1-2	McDonough Gymnasium; Washington, DC
Sat., Dec. 12, 1959 no, no		Saint Peter's	W 95–80	2-2	McDonough Gymnasium; Washington, DC
Mon., Dec. 14, 1959 no, no		at Maryland	L 48–59	2-3	Cole Field House; College Park, MD
Thu., Dec. 17, 1959 no, no		at Niagara	L 80–81	2-4	Buffalo Memorial Auditorium; Buffalo, NY
Sat., Dec. 19, 1959 no, no		at Duquesne	W 64–63	3-4	Civic Arena; Pittsburgh, PA
Tue., Dec. 29, 1959 no, no		vs. Brown; Providence Invitational Tournament	W 82–65	4-4	Alumni Hall; Providence, RI
Thu., Dec. 31, 1959 no, no		at Providence; Providence Invitational Tournament	L 56–83	4-5	Alumni Hall; Providence, RI
Wed., Jan. 6, 1960 no, no		at George Washington	W 86–82	5-5	Fort Myer Gymnasium; Fort Myer, VA
Sat., Jan. 9, 1960 no, no		at Manhattan	L 82–90	5-6	Madison Square Garden; New York, NY
Wed., Jan. 13, 1960 no, no		Maryland	W 66–51	6-6	McDonough Gymnasium; Washington, DC
Sat., Jan. 16, 1960 no, no		at La Salle	L 79–80	6-7	Palestra; Philadelphia, PA
Thu., Jan. 28, 1960 no, no		at Fairfield	W 91–74	7-7	New Haven Arena; New Haven, CT
Sat., Jan. 30, 1960 no, no		at Boston College	L 77–93	7-8	Roberts Center; Chestnut Hill, MA
Wed., Feb. 3, 1960 no, no		Muhlenberg	W 93–72	8-8	McDonough Gymnasium; Washington, DC
Fri., Feb. 5, 1960 no, no		at Fordham	W 82–72	9-8	Rose Hill Gymnasium; Bronx, NY
Sun., Feb. 7, 1960 no, no		at New York Athletic Club	L 90–106	exhibition	New York Athletic Club Gymnasium; New York, NY
Wed., Feb. 10, 1960 no, no		George Washington	L 67–73	9-9	McDonough Gymnasium; Washington, DC
Sat., Feb. 13, 1960 no, no		Lafayette	W 69–60	10-9	McDonough Gymnasium; Washington, DC
Wed., Feb. 17, 1960 no, no		Navy	L 68–79	10-10	McDonough Gymnasium; Washington, DC
Sat., Feb. 20, 1960 no, no		at Seton Hall	L 77–80	10-11	Walsh Gymnasium; South Orange, NJ
Fri., Feb. 26, 1960 no, no		Scranton	W 105–80	11-11	McDonough Gymnasium; Washington, DC
Sat., Feb. 27, 1960 no, no		Rhode Island	L 95–97	11-12	McDonough Gymnasium; Washington, DC
*Non-conference game. ^{#}Rankings from AP Poll. (#) Tournament seedings in parentheses.
