= 1932–33 Georgetown Hoyas men's basketball team =

American college basketball season

1932–33 Georgetown Hoyas men's basketball
- Conference: Eastern Intercollegiate Conference
- Record: 6–11 (3-5 EIC)
- Head coach: Fred Mesmer (2nd season)
- Captain: Johnny "Jake" Crowley
- Home arena: Tech Gymnasium

1932–33 Eastern Intercollegiate Conference men's basketball standings
	Conf.				Overall
Team	W		L	PCT	W		L	PCT
Pittsburgh	7	–	1	.875	17	–	5	.773
Temple	5	–	3	.625	15	–	6	.714
Carnegie Tech	4	–	4	.500	4	–	5	.444
Georgetown	3	–	5	.375	6	–	11	.353
West Virginia	1	–	7	.125	10	–	14	.417

The 1932–33 Georgetown Hoyas men's basketball team represented Georgetown University during the 1932–33 NCAA college basketball season. Fred Mesmer coached it in his second season as head coach. For the first time in its history, Georgetown was a member of an athletic conference for basketball competition, joining Carnegie Tech, Pittsburgh, Temple, and West Virginia as founding members of the Eastern Intercollegiate Conference (EIC), which began play this season; Georgetown would remain a member of the EIC until it disbanded after the end of the 1938-39 season. The team played its home games at Tech Gymnasium on the campus of McKinley Technical High School in Washington, D.C. – except for one home game it played at Central High School Gymnasium on the campus of Washington, D.C.'s Central High School – and finished with a record of 6–11 overall, 3–5 in the EIC.

== Season recap ==
Sophomore forward Ed Hargaden joined the varsity team this season and quickly emerged as a high scorer. In the first game of the season, on December 12, 1932, at Pittsburgh in Georgetown's first-ever EIC game, he scored 12 of the Hoyas' 18 points. In a conference game against West Virginia on February 6, 1933, he scored a season-high 18 points, and he finished the season with an average of 9.1 points per game – a considerable achievement in a low-scoring era – and was Georgetown's leading scorer for the year, as he would be in all three seasons of his varsity career.

The team won only three of its first 11 games, also going 1-5 in its new conference during this stretch. It finished the year with a three-game winning streak, including two EIC games, giving it a final record of 6–11 overall and 3–5 in the EIC. It was the Hoyas' second 6–11 finish in a row and third straight losing record.

Hargaden's son, guard Ed Hargaden Jr., would become the first second-generation Georgetown men's basketball player, playing for Georgetown on the 1957–58, 1958–59, and 1959–60 teams. The Hargadens would be the only father and son to play for the Hoyas until center Patrick Ewing's son, forward Patrick Ewing Jr., joined the team in the 2006–07 season.

== Roster ==
This was the last season in which Georgetown players did not wear numbers on their jerseys. The first numbered jerseys in Georgetown men's basketball history would appear the following season.

Name	Height	Weight (lbs.)	Position	Class	Hometown	Previous Team(s)
Tom Carolan	N/A	N/A	F	Jr.	Syracuse, NY, U.S.	Christian Brothers Academy
Bill Connors	N/A	N/A	G	Jr.	N/A	N/A
Joe Corless	N/A	N/A	G	So.	N/A	N/A
Johnny "Jack" Crowley	N/A	N/A	G	Jr.	N/A	N/A
Ed Hargaden	N/A	N/A	F	So.	Syracuse, NY, U.S.	Christian Brothers Academy
Herman Heide	N/A	N/A	G	Jr.	N/A	N/A
Vernon Murphy	N/A	N/A	C	Sr.	N/A	N/A
Jerry O'Connor	N/A	N/A	C	Jr.	N/A	N/A
Charley Parcells	5'11"	N/A	F	So.	Hackensack, NJ, U.S.	Hackensack HS

== 1932–33 schedule and results ==
It was common practice at this time for colleges and universities to include non-collegiate opponents in their schedules, with the games recognized as part of their official record for the season, and the January 13, 1933, game played against the Brooklyn Knights of Columbus therefore counted as part of Georgetown's won-loss record for 1932–33. It was not until 1952, after the completion of the 1951–52 season, that the National Collegiate Athletic Association (NCAA) ruled that colleges and universities could no longer count games played against non-collegiate opponents in their annual won-loss records.

Date time, TV	Opponent	Result	Record	Site city, state
Regular Season
Sat., Dec. 10, 1932 no, no	at Pittsburgh	L 18–32	0-1 (0-1)	Pitt Pavilion; Pittsburgh, PA
Fri., Dec. 16, 1932* no, no	Duke	L 30–35	0-2	Tech Gymnasium; Washington, DC
Thu., Jan. 5, 1933* no, no	at Canisius	W 28–26	1-2	Elmwood Hall; Buffalo, NY
Fri., Jan. 6, 1933* no, no	at Colgate	W 29–26	2-2	Huntington Gymnasium; Hamilton, NY
Sat., Jan. 7, 1933* no, no	at New York University	L 28–31	2-3	University Heights Gymnasium; New York, NY
Fri., Jan. 13, 1933* no, no	at Brooklyn Knights of Columbus	L 22–27	2-4	N/A; New York, NY
Fri., Jan. 20, 1933* no, no	St. John's	L 24–31	2-5	Central High School Gymnasium; Washington, DC
Sat., Jan. 21, 1933 no, no	at Temple	L 19–31	2-6 (0-2)	Mitten Hall; Philadelphia, PA
Wed., Feb. 1, 1933 no, no	Temple	L 41–44	2-7 (0-3)	Tech Gymnasium; Washington, DC
Sat., Feb. 4, 1933* no, no	at Loyola Maryland	L 31–41	2-8	Alumni Gymnasium; Baltimore, MD
Mon., Feb. 6, 1933 no, no	West Virginia	W 48–25	3-8 (1-3)	Tech Gymnasium; Washington, DC
Wed., Feb. 8, 1933* no, no	Mount St. Mary's	L 39–40	3-9	Tech Gymnasium; Washington, DC
Fri., Feb. 17, 1933 no, no	at West Virginia	L Forfeit	3-10 (1-4)	WVU Field House; Morgantown, WV
Sat., Feb. 18, 1933 no, no	at Carnegie Tech	L 27–32	3-11 (1-5)	Skibo Gymnasium; Pittsburgh, PA
Fri., Feb. 24, 1933 no, no	Pittsburgh	W 28–27	4-11 (2-5)	Tech Gymnasium; Washington, DC
Sat., Feb. 25, 1933* no, no	Baltimore	W 45–15	5-11	Tech Gymnasium; Washington, DC
Wed., Mar. 1, 1933 no, no	Carnegie Tech	W 43–41	6-11 (3-5)	Tech Gymnasium; Washington, DC
*Non-conference game. (#) Tournament seedings in parentheses.
