= 1934–35 Georgetown Hoyas men's basketball team =

American college basketball season

1934–35 Georgetown Hoyas men's basketball
- Conference: Eastern Intercollegiate Conference
- Record: 6–13 (1-7 EIC)
- Head coach: Fred Mesmer (4th season)
- Captain: Ed Hargaden
- Home arena: Tech Gymnasium

1934–35 Eastern Intercollegiate Conference men's basketball standings
	Conf.				Overall
Team	W		L	PCT	W		L	PCT
Pittsburgh†	6	–	2	.750	18	–	6	.750
West Virginia	6	–	2	.750	16	–	6	.727
Temple	5	–	3	.625	17	–	7	.708
Carnegie Tech	2	–	6	.250	3	–	6	.333
Georgetown	1	–	7	.125	6	–	13	.316
† Postseason conference championship playoff game winner

The 1934–35 Georgetown Hoyas men's basketball team represented Georgetown University during the 1934–35 NCAA college basketball season. Fred Mesmer coached it in his fourth season as head coach. The team was a member of the Eastern Intercollegiate Conference (EIC) and played its home games at Tech Gymnasium on the campus of McKinley Technical High School in Washington, D.C. The team was the least successful of Mesmer's tenure, finishing with a record of 6–13 overall, 1–7 in the EIC.

== Season recap ==
The team's star during this difficult season was senior forward Ed Hargaden, who led the Hoyas in scoring for the third straight year and in all three seasons of his varsity career. Averaging a career-high 9.2 points per game for the season, he was the first three-year scoring champion for Georgetown since the 1920–21 season. He had averaged 9.8 points per game over his collegiate career.

Hargaden's son, guard Ed Hargaden Jr., would become the first second-generation Georgetown men's basketball player, playing for Georgetown on the 1957–58, 1958–59, and 1959–60 teams. The Hargadens would be the only father and son to play for the Hoyas until center Patrick Ewing's son, forward Patrick Ewing Jr., joined the team in the 2006–07 season.

== Roster ==
#	Name	Height	Weight (lbs.)	Position	Class	Hometown	Previous Team(s)
51	Ed Bodine	N/A	N/A	F	Jr.	N/A	N/A
52	Don Gibeau	N/A	N/A	G	So.	Syracuse, NY, U.S.	Christian Brothers Academy
54	Charley Parcells	5'11"	N/A	F	Sr.	Hackensack, NJ, U.S.	Hackensack HS
55	Leon Esenstadt	N/A	N/A	F	Sr.	N/A	N/A
56	Ed Hargaden	N/A	N/A	F	Sr.	Syracuse, NY, U.S.	Christian Brothers Academy
60	Joe Corless	N/A	N/A	G	Sr.	N/A	N/A
61	John "Jake" Young	N/A	N/A	F	Jr.	N/A	N/A
62	Ben Zola	N/A	N/A	G	So.	Washington, DC, U.S.	Eastern HS
64	James Regis	N/A	N/A	G	So.	N/A	N/A
65	John Loving	N/A	N/A	G	Jr.	N/A	N/A

== 1934–35 schedule and results ==
Date time, TV	Opponent	Result	Record	Site city, state
Regular Season
Wed., Dec. 12, 1934* no, no	Western Maryland	W 38–34	1-0	Tech Gymnasium; Washington, DC
Fri., Dec. 14, 1934* no, no	at Bucknell	W 26–15	2-0	Tustin Gymnasium; Lewisburg, PA
Sat., Dec. 15, 1934 no, no	at Carnegie Tech	L 31–43	2-1 (0-1)	Skibo Gymnasium; Pittsburgh, PA
Fri., Jan. 11, 1935* no, no	at New York University	L 21–37	2-2	University Heights Gymnasium; New York, NY
Sat., Jan. 12, 1935* no, no	at Manhattan	L 27–33	2-3	Manhattan Gymnasium; New York, NY
Sun., Jan. 13, 1935 no, no	at Temple	L 31–37	2-4 (0-2)	Mitten Hall; Philadelphia, PA
Wed., Jan. 16, 1935* no, no	at Navy	L 25–36	2-5	Dahlgren Hall; Annapolis, MD
Sat., Jan. 19, 1935* no, no	Bucknell	W 37–22	3-5	Tech Gymnasium; Washington, DC
Sat., Jan. 26, 1935 no, no	Carnegie Tech	W 34–30	4-5 (1-2)	Tech Gymnasium; Washington, DC
Wed., Jan. 30, 1935* no, no	at Army	L 22–29	4-6	Hayes Gymnasium; West Point, NY
Thu., Jan. 31, 1935* no, no	at Yale	W 32–29	5-6	Payne Whitney Gymnasium; New Haven, CT
Fri., Feb. 8, 1935* no, no	New York University	L 36–50	5-7	Tech Gymnasium; Washington, DC
Mon., Feb. 11, 1935 no, no	West Virginia	L 16–38	5-8 (1-3)	Tech Gymnasium; Washington, DC
Wed., Feb. 20, 1935 no, no	Temple	L 31–36	5-9 (1-4)	Tech Gymnasium; Washington, DC
Sat., Feb. 23, 1935 no, no	Pittsburgh	L 24–42	5-10 (1-5)	Tech Gymnasium; Washington, DC
Fri., Mar. 1, 1935* no, no	Mount St. Mary's	L 27–30	5-11	Tech Gymnasium; Washington, DC
Wed., Mar. 6, 1935 no, no	at Pittsburgh	L 25–40	5-12 (1-6)	Pitt Pavilion; Pittsburgh, PA
Thu., Mar. 7, 1935 no, no	at West Virginia	L 13–43	5-13 (1-7)	WVU Field House; Morgantown, WV
Mon., Mar. 11, 1935* no, no	at Maryland	W 25–24	6-13	Ritchie Coliseum; College Park, MD
*Non-conference game. (#) Tournament seedings in parentheses.
