= 2006–07 Georgetown Hoyas men's basketball team =

American college basketball season

2006–07 Georgetown Hoyas men's basketball

Big East Regular Season Champions Big East tournament champions

NCAA tournament, Final Four
- Conference: Big East

Ranking
- Coaches: No. 4
- AP: No. 8
- Record: 30–7 (13–3 Big East)
- Head coach: John Thompson III (3rd season)
- Assistant coaches: Robert Burke (3rd season); Kevin Broadus (3rd season); Sydney Johnson (3rd season)
- Captains: Jeff Green; Tyler Crawford
- Home arena: Verizon Center

2006–07 Big East men's basketball standings
	Conf.				Overall
Team	W		L	PCT	W		L	PCT
No. 8 Georgetown †	13	–	3	.813	30	–	7	.811
No. 16 Louisville	12	–	4	.750	24	–	10	.706
No. 12 Pittsburgh	12	–	4	.750	29	–	8	.784
No. 17 Notre Dame	11	–	5	.688	24	–	8	.750
No. 20 Marquette	10	–	6	.625	24	–	10	.706
West Virginia	9	–	7	.563	27	–	9	.750
DePaul	9	–	7	.563	20	–	14	.588
Villanova	9	–	7	.563	22	–	11	.667
Providence	8	–	8	.500	18	–	13	.581
St. John's	7	–	9	.438	16	–	15	.516
Connecticut	6	–	10	.375	17	–	14	.548
*Seton Hall	4	–	12	.250	13	–	16	.448
*South Florida	3	–	13	.188	12	–	18	.400
*Rutgers	3	–	13	.188	10	–	19	.345
*Cincinnati	2	–	14	.125	11	–	19	.367
**Syracuse	0	–	6	.000	2	–	11	.154
† 2007 Big East tournament winner As of April 2, 2007; Rankings from AP Poll; *Did not qualify for 2007 Big East tournament **Syracuse had 22 regular season games and two postseason games vacated due to sanctions against the program; Syracuse′s disputed record was 10–6, 24–11.

The 2006–07 Georgetown Hoyas men's basketball team was an NCAA Division I college basketball team competing in the Big East Conference representing Georgetown University. The Hoyas finished first place in the conference, won the conference tournament, and advanced to the semifinals in the NCAA tournament. The 2006–07 season marked the centennial of Hoya hoops, which was celebrated by honoring some of the team's most famous alumni at the Georgetown-Marquette game on February 10, 2007. The team was led by juniors, forward Jeff Green, center Roy Hibbert, and point guard Jonathan Wallace. The team's freshmen were DaJuan Summers, Vernon Macklin, and Jeremiah Rivers. Other regular players are Tyler Crawford, Jessie Sapp, and Patrick Ewing Jr.

On March 3, 2007, the Hoyas won their first regular-season Big East Championship since 1989. On March 10, 2007, the Hoyas defeated the Pittsburgh Panthers (65–42) to win the 2007 Big East tournament championship, also for the first time since 1989. Jeff Green was named the Big East Player of the year and the tournament's Most Outstanding Player.

The Hoyas advanced to the 2007 Final Four before losing to an Ohio State team led by Greg Oden. In the NCAA tournament's first weekend, the Hoyas defeated Belmont and Boston College. The Hoyas' games in the second weekend were some of the closest and most-watched contests of the tournament. The Hoyas defeated Vanderbilt on a last-second bank shot by Jeff Green, then beat North Carolina in the Regional Final when their defense caused North Carolina to suffer an improbable collapse in which the Tar Heels missed 21 of their final 23 field goal attempts.

== Season recap ==
=== Regular season ===
==== Non-conference schedule ====
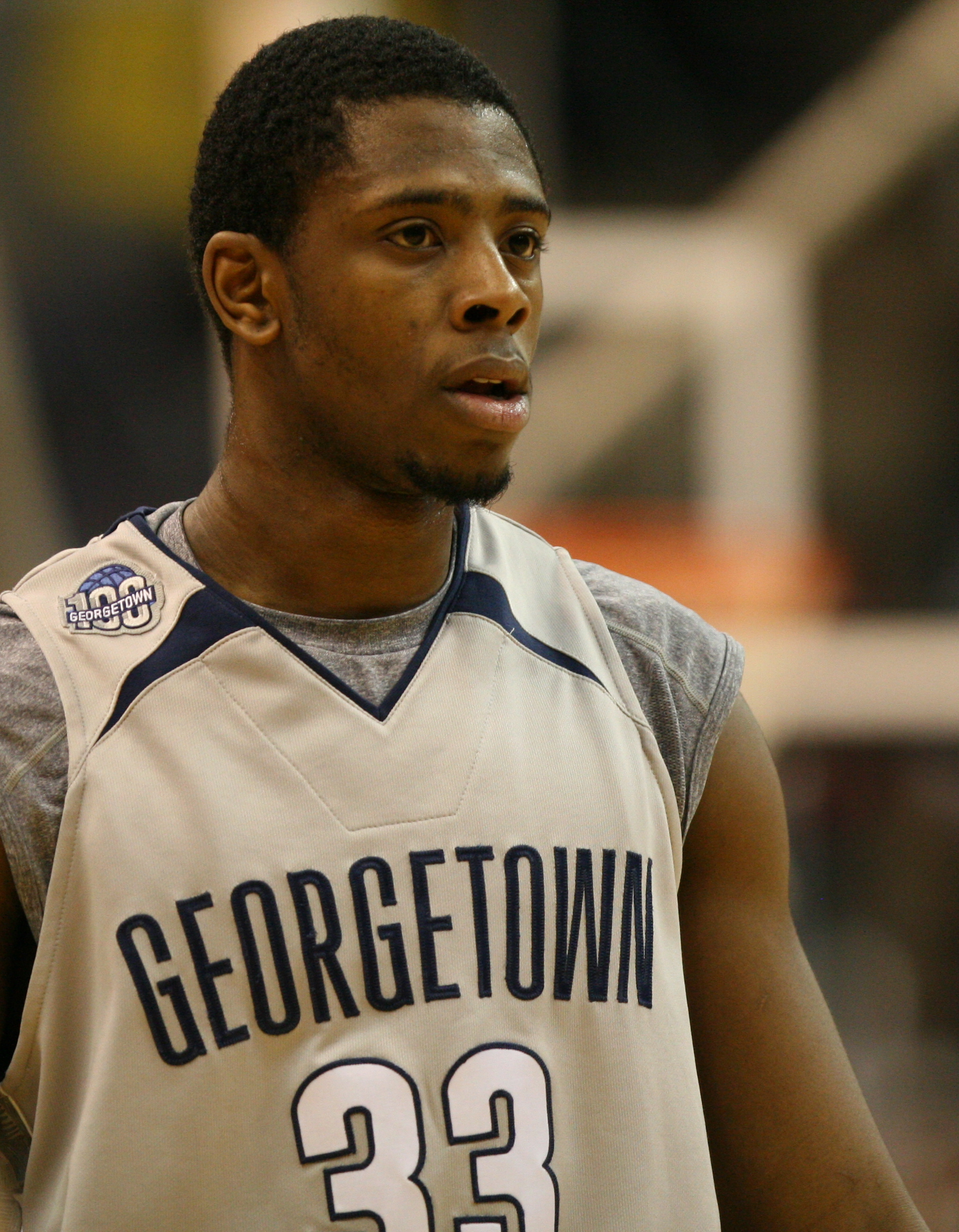
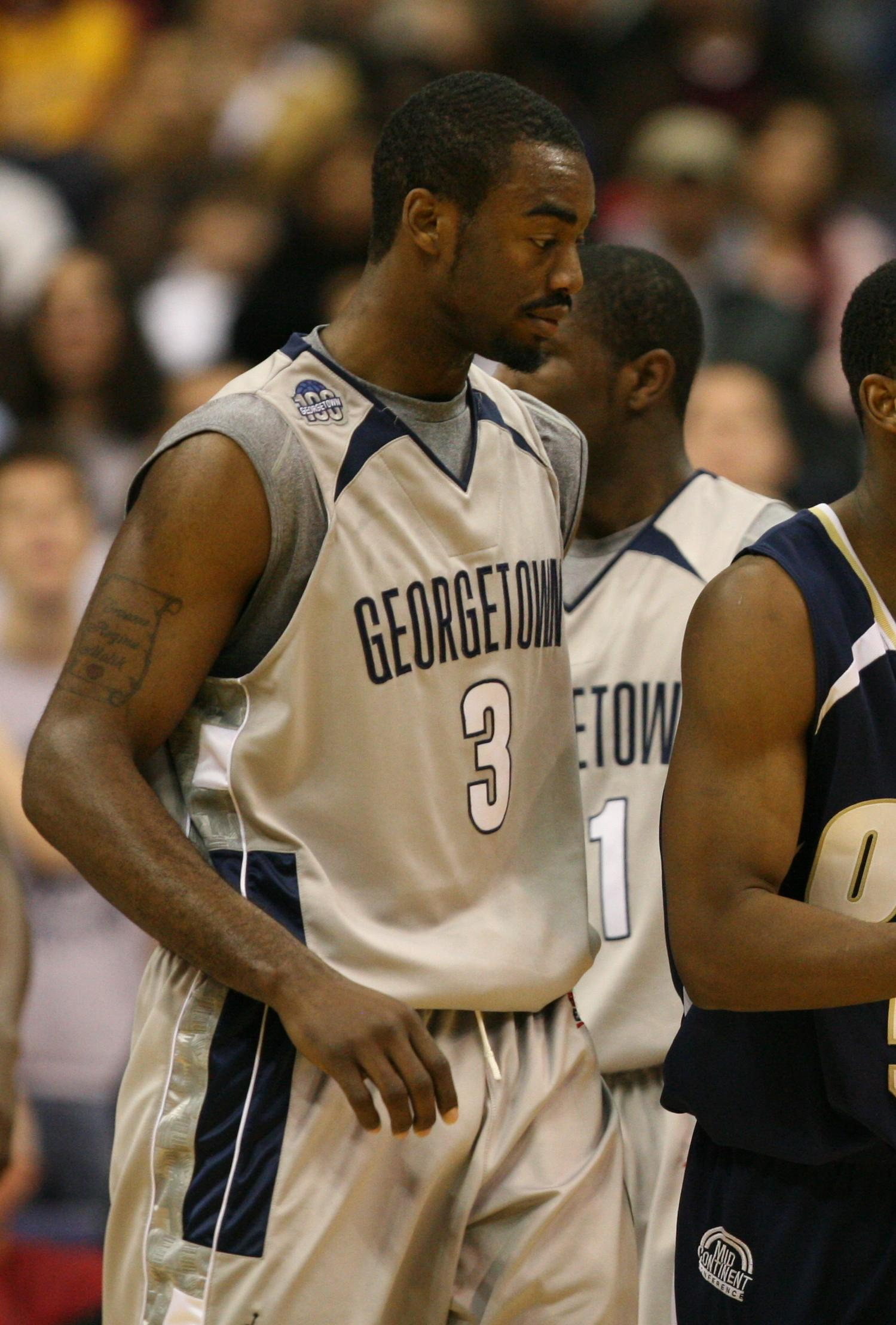
Patrick Ewing Jr. (left) and DaJuan Summers (right) during breaks in the action against Oral Roberts at the Verizon Center on December 9, 2006.
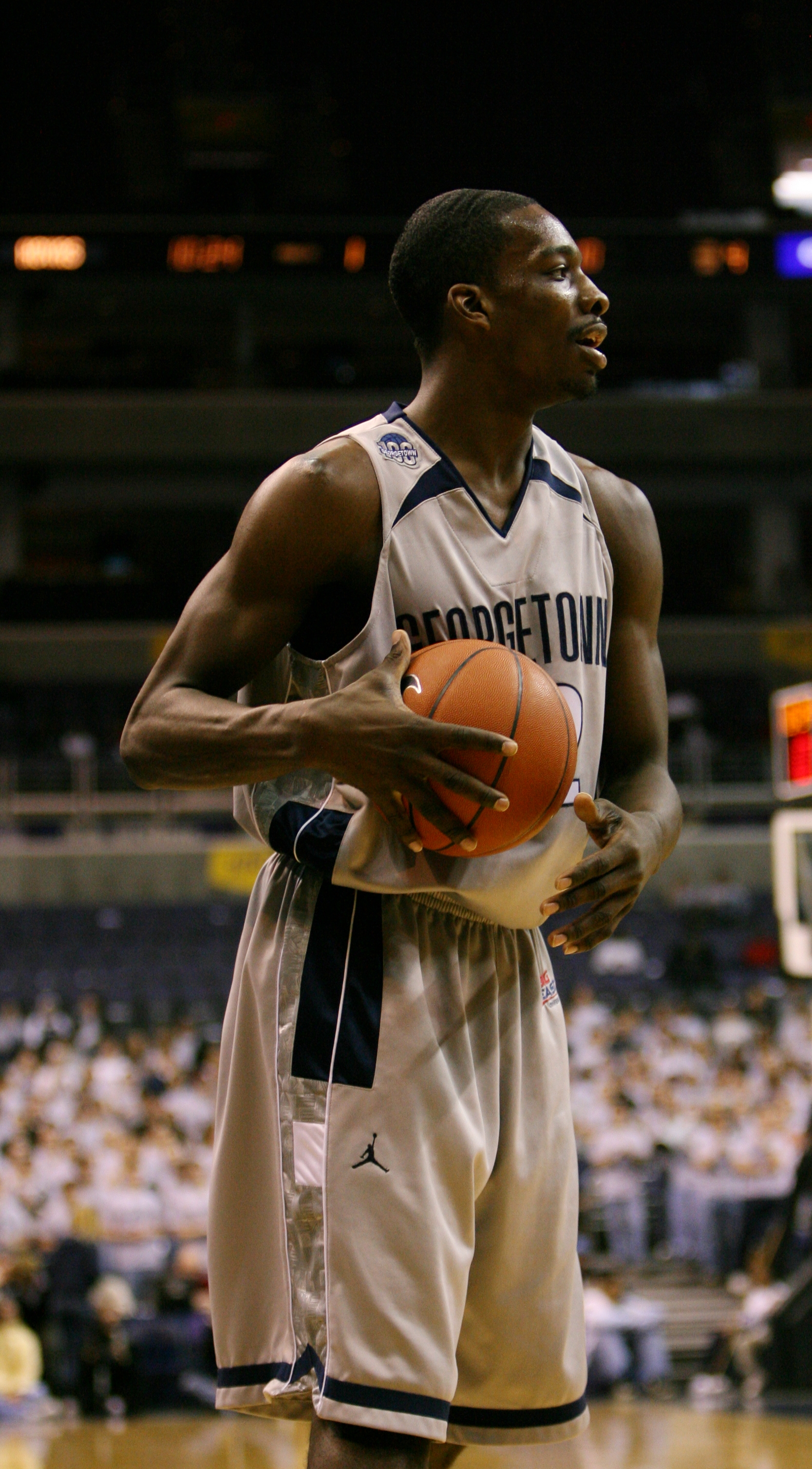
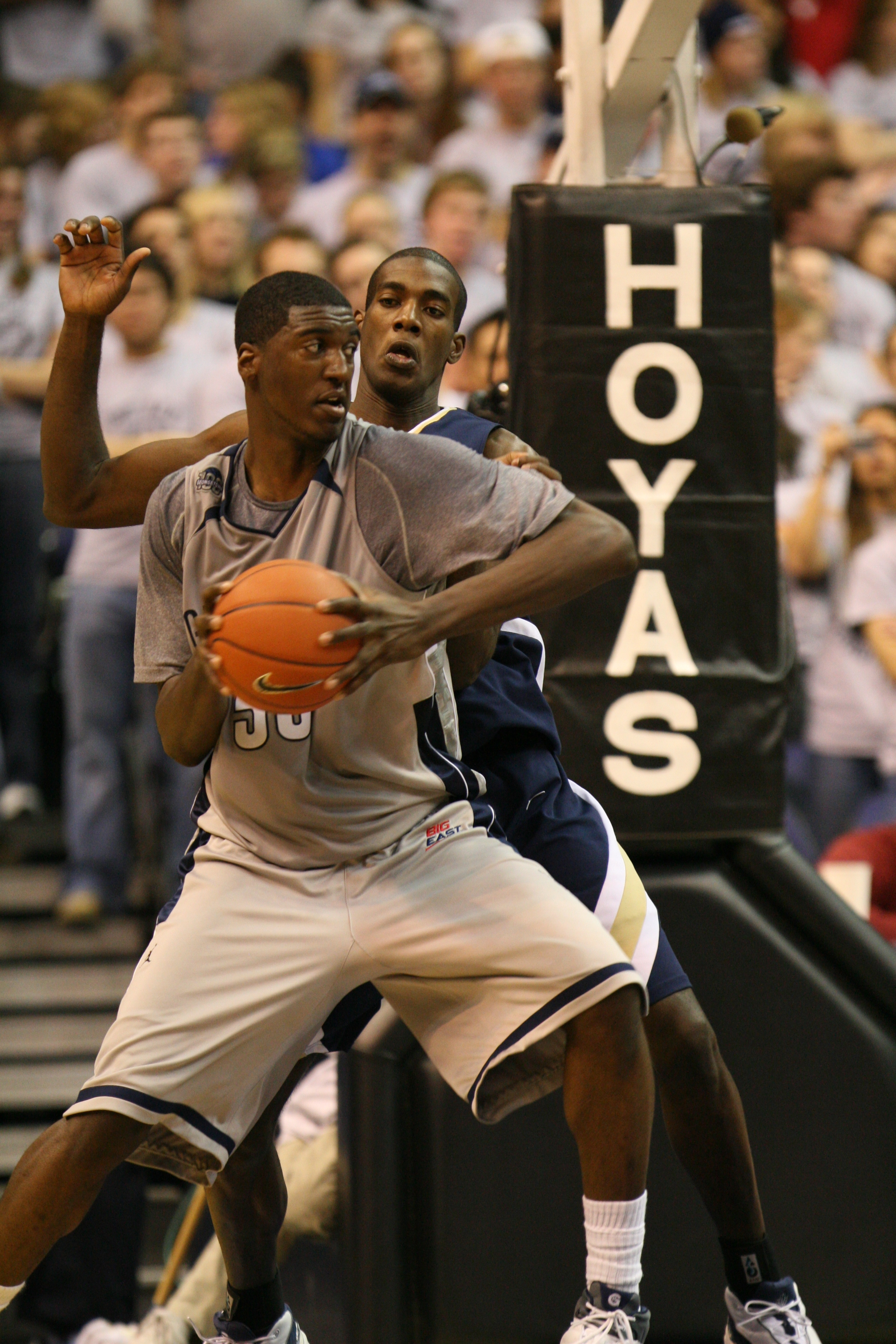
Jeff Green (left) and Roy Hibbert (right) in action against Oral Roberts at the Verizon Center on December 9, 2006.

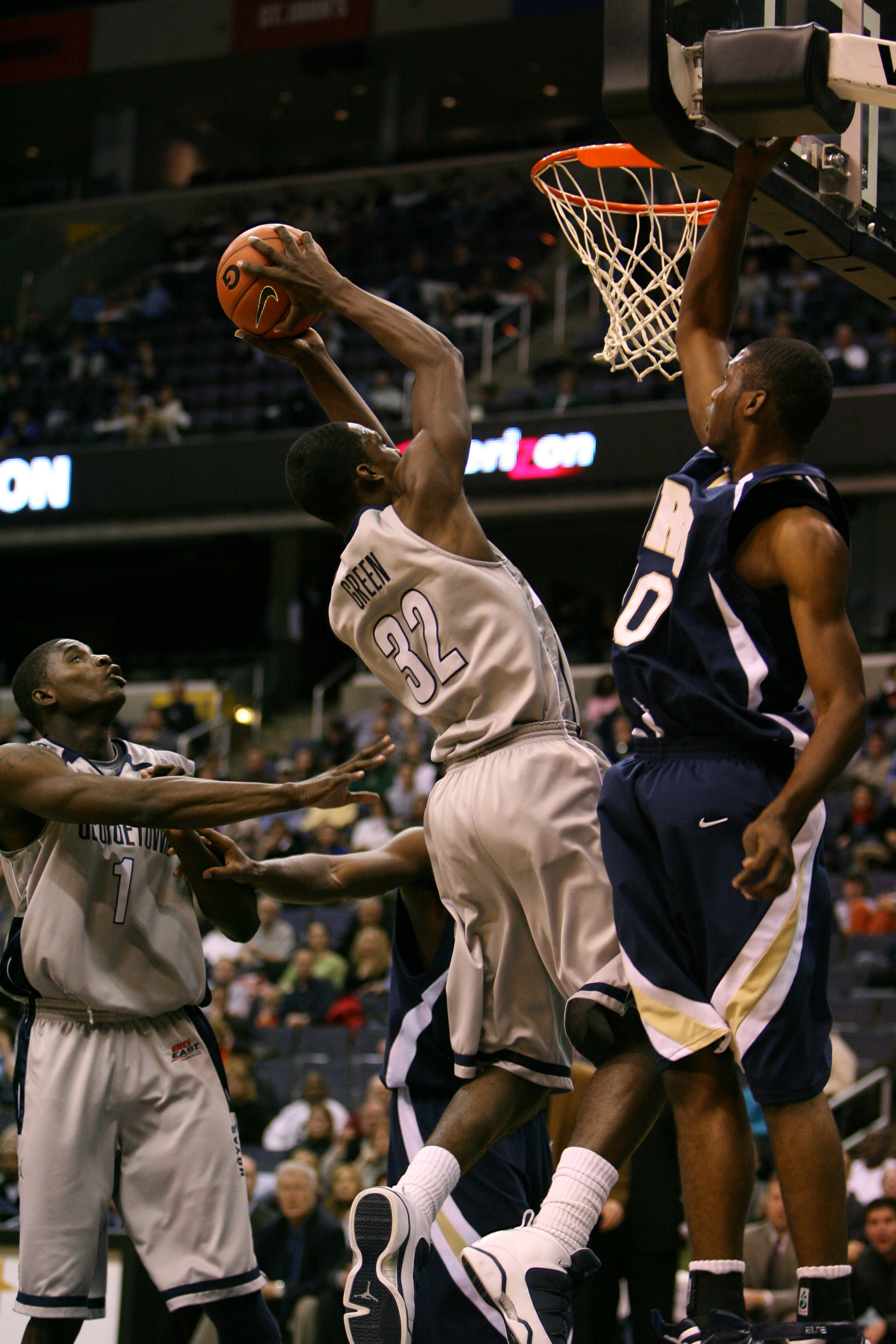
Jeff Green jumps for the basket with Vernon Macklin behind him against Oral Roberts at the Verizon Center on December 9, 2006.

Returning three starters – forward Jeff Green, center Roy Hibbert, and point guard Jonathan Wallace – from the previous season, coming off a 2006 NCAA tournament appearance, and boasting their highest preseason poll ranking (No. 8) since 1995, the Hoyas opened the 2006–07 season with high expectations.

Georgetown began the season with consecutive wins over Hartford and at Vanderbilt, in the latter game handing Vanderbilt its first opening-game loss on its home court since November 14, 1990; the Commodores had been 62–4 against non-conference opponents there. Against Hartford, Green scored 17 points, Hibbert had 16, and Wallace contributed 13, and in the Vanderbilt game, Hibbert had a double-double (18 points and 10 rebounds), while Green scored 19 points, despite playing only seven minutes in the first half due to foul trouble, and Wallace and sophomore guard Jessie Sapp contributed 13 and 11 points, respectively. But the Hoyas stumbled in their third game despite a 17-point, eight-rebound performance by Hibbert, when Old Dominion rallied from an eight-point deficit in the second half to beat Georgetown, snapping a 23-game Hoya winning streak at McDonough Gymnasium that dated back to February 1982. In the next game, freshman forward DaJuan Summers scored in double digits for the first time in his college career with 17 points and Sapp contributed 14 in a win at Fairfield.

A game followed against Ball State, coached by former Georgetown player and assistant coach Ronny Thompson, the younger brother of John Thompson III, in the first meeting of the brothers as opposing head coaches. Their father, former Georgetown head coach John Thompson Jr., called the meeting a "stupid" idea, and he attended the game wearing a neutral black ballcap with a "T" embroidered on its front, barely expressing emotion as Georgetown defeated Ball State 69–54 in a one-sided contest in which Jeff Green scored 14 points, DaJuan Summers scored 12, and freshman forward Vernon Macklin contributed 10 points. After the game, John Thompson III discussed a rematch scheduled for the following season, saying "We may cancel that...This is hard. I knew it would be difficult, and it was much more difficult, to tell you the truth, than I ever thought it would be. That's my brother. I want them to have some success. I want to watch their tapes in a manner in which to help them rather than figure out to beat them." But the rematch between the brothers was not to be, because by the time the teams met again a year later, Billy Taylor had replaced Ronny Thompson as Ball State's head coach.

After the Old Dominion loss, Georgetown had fallen from No. 8 to No. 14 in the AP Poll, and the Hoyas fell farther to No. 18 by the time they played Oregon to close out November. Although Jonathan Wallace scored 17 points, the Ducks overcame their own poor shooting to defeat Georgetown in Oregon's first win in eight tries over a Top 25 team in a game played on the United States East Coast. Next up was a game at No. 10 Duke on December 2, Georgetown's first ranked opponent during the season. The underdog Hoyas shot 57.7 percent in the first half and led 34–27 at halftime, but the game was very different in the second half, during which Georgetown shot only 26.1 percent (6-for-23) and committed 11 turnovers. With 11:28 to go in the game, Georgetown still led 43-39, but scored only two more field goals. Meanwhile, Duke sophomore guard Greg Paulus and freshman guard Jon Scheyer scored all 13 and all nine of their points, respectively, in the second half, combining for 16 straight points at one point. Hibbert had 11 points and six rebounds, Jeff Green had eight points, 10 rebounds, and five assists, Jessie Sapp had 13 points, and Georgetown led 49–47 on a Hibbert drive with 6:27 left in the game, but Duke took the lead for good at 4:55 and won 61–52. The Blue Devils lengthened their home winning streak against nonconference opponents to 46 games, the second-longest such active streak in the United States, and gave head coach Mike Krzyzewski his 760th career win.

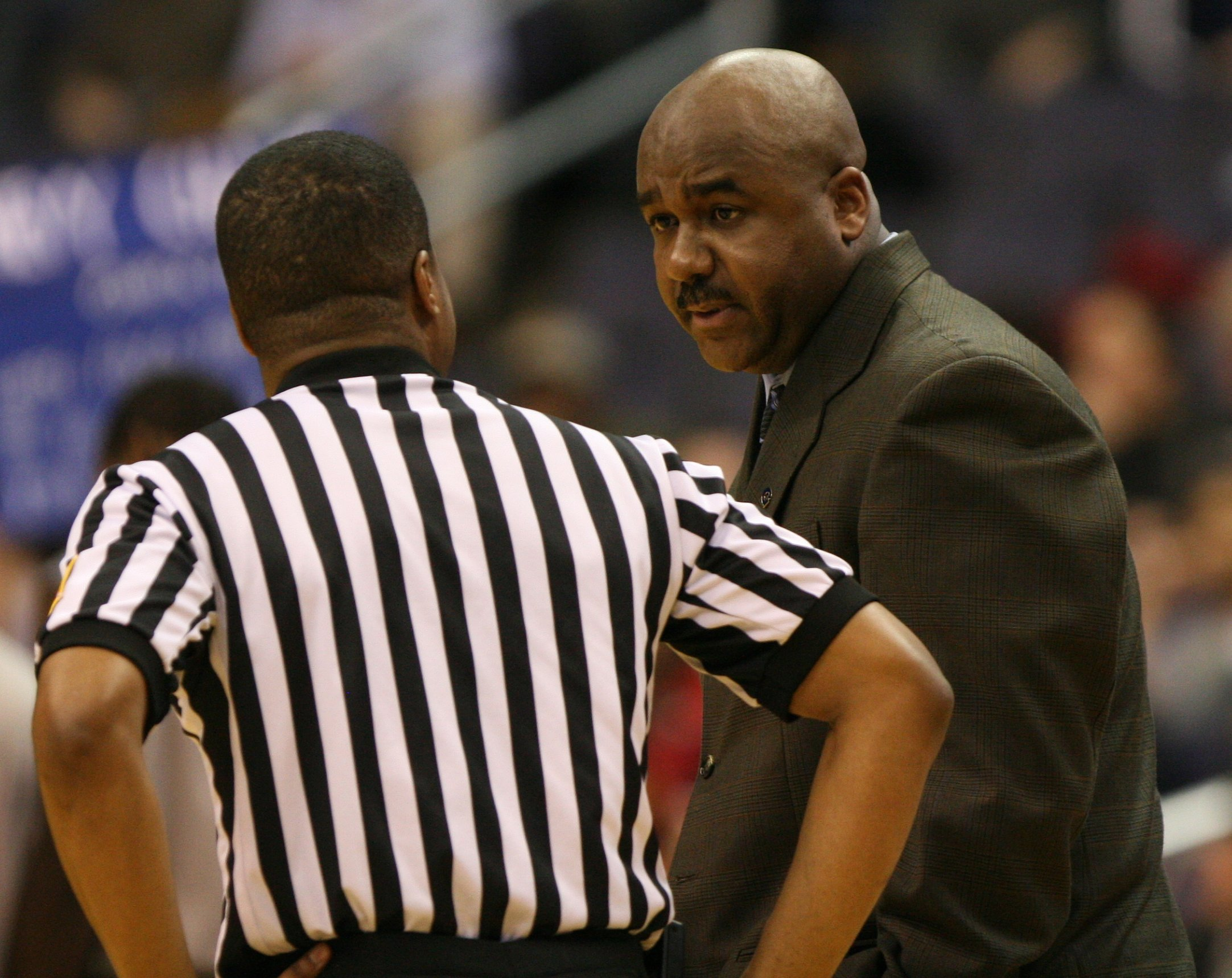
John Thompson III talks with a referee on the sidelines during the Oral Roberts game on December 9, 2006.

After the back-to-back losses to Oregon and Duke, Georgetown's record stood at 4–3, and the Hoyas fell out of the Top 25, not to return for two months. However, the Hoyas promptly embarked on the first of two lengthy winning streaks. It began with a win over James Madison on December 5 in which Jeff Green – who had scored in double digits only once in the previous five games – had 17 points and five assists, Jessie Sapp scored 15 points, Jonathan Wallace contributed 14 points, and Georgetown – which had gone a collective 3-for-23 (11.5 percent) from three-point range against Oregon and Duke – tied the school record for three-pointers when junior forward Patrick Ewing Jr., a newcomer to the team, hit the Hoyas′ 16th three-pointer of the game with 3:56 left to play, tying the 16 scored at Davidson in November 2004. As the winning streak continued, Green scored 15 points against Oral Roberts and 12 against Towson and had 20 points and nine rebounds against Navy; Hibbert had his second double-double (23 points, 11 rebounds) of the season in the Oral Roberts game, 10 points against Winston-Salem State, 15 points and seven rebounds against Navy; and 14 points against Michigan; Jonathan Wallace scored 12 points against Oral Roberts, 14 points against Towson, and 12 against Michigan; DaJuan Summers scored 14 points against Winston-Salem State and 18 against Towson; junior guard/forward and team co-captain Tyler Crawford, who had missed several games due to a bout with strep throat that resulted in a hospital stay, had 12 points vs. Wilson-Salem State; and sophomore Marc Egerson had 11 points each against Oral Roberts and Michigan. Other highlights of the streak included a 70-percent Georgetown team shooting performance from the floor during the second half of the Winston-Salem State game and the defeat of Michigan to close out December, which dealt the Wolverines their first loss in their last 14 nonconference games at Crisler Arena; Georgetown shot 23-for-44 (52.3%), becoming only the second team at the time to shoot better than 50 percent against Michigan.

==== Conference schedule ====
Marc Egerson left the team for "personal reasons" (he later transferred to Delaware) before Georgetown, with a 10-3 record and a six-game winning streak, opened its Big East season with a game against No. 17 Notre Dame on January 6 and thoroughly dominated the Fighting Irish on offense and defense. Notre Dame shot 1-for-10 and committed six turnovers during the game's first 8½ minutes, and Georgetown jumped out to an 18–2 lead and then extended it to 29–9. Notre Dame closed to an 11-point deficit by halftime, but the Hoyas went on a 14–0 run early in the second half that pushed their lead to 29 points. Hibbert scored a game-high 18 points on 8-for-9 (.889) shooting. The Hoyas held Notre Dame, which averaged 88 points per game and was shooting 41 percent from three-point range entering the contest, to 4-for-22 (18 percent) in three-pointers, and the Fighting Irish finished with fewer than 50 points for the first time since joining the Big East in 1995. Georgetown won in a 66–48 upset, ending a 12-game Notre Dame winning streak and extending Georgetown's to seven.

Georgetown stumbled in its next game, losing to Villanova – despite DaJuan Summers′ 16 points, with the team′ leading scorer, Hibbert, getting only two points – before facing No. 7 Pittsburgh. Jeff Green and Jessie Sapp each had 15 points against Pittsburgh – Green reaching 1,000 points for his college career – and Patrick Ewing Jr., contributed 12 points, while Hibbert had 11 points and two rebounds. With the teams shooting a combined 60 percent from the floor and Pittsburgh outrebounding Georgetown, the Hoyas led 18–17 halfway through the first half, but Pittsburgh then went on a 20–8 run to take the lead for good and won the game 74–69. The loss left Georgetown with a 1–2 conference record, but the Hoyas were destined to lose only two more games during the entire remaining season and postseason combined.

As the Big East season continued, the Hoyas began a second – and even longer – winning streak. During the early part of the string of victories, Jeff Green scored 19 points in a win against DePaul, 17 points against Cincinnati, a then-career-high 24 points at St. John's, and 14 points against Louisville. Roy Hibbert had a 16-point game at Rutgers 10 points at Seton Hall, 12 points against DePaul a career-high 26 points as part of another double double with 11 rebounds and two blocked shots against Cincinnati, and still another double double (22 points and 11 rebounds) against Louisville. DaJuan Summers scored 16 points at Rutgers, had a double double (17 points and 10 rebounds) at Seton Hall, and contributed 12 points in the victory over DePaul and 13 against Louisville, while Jonathan Wallace had a career-high 21 points at Seton Hall and 13 points at St. John's and Jessie Sapp scored 11 against Louisville.

By the time of the Louisville game on February 7, the Hoyas, ranked No. 22, had returned to the Top 25 for the first time in two months. Georgetown was still No. 22, riding a six-game winning streak, and celebrating the 100th anniversary of its basketball program – including a halftime ceremony in which it honored its "all-century team," which included Patrick Ewing, Eric "Sleepy" Floyd, Michael Jackson, Dikembe Mutombo, Alonzo Mourning, and Allen Iverson – on February 10 when the Hoyas faced No. 11 Marquette, winners of eight straight, at the Verizon Center. The Golden Eagles made only three of their first 14 shots from the floor, but went on a 9–0 run to close to within one point, and Georgetown led by only 28–26 at the half. With Georgetown leading 53–52 with 7:29 left in the game, Green and Hibbert combined to score the next 17 points. With Marquette making only one field goal and four free throws the rest of the game, Georgetown closed the game out with a 23-5 run that gave the Hoyas a 76–58 upset victory. Green had a then-career-high-tying 24 points, Hibbert had another double-double (23 points plus 11 rebounds), and Wallace and Summers each contributed 10 points.

Two days after beating Marquette, Georgetown, by now ranked No. 14, faced another ranked opponent, No. 23 West Virginia, in a contest between the two best defenses in the Big East Conference. Georgetown's Princeton offense outdueled West Virginia's trap defense, and the Hoya defense crimped West Virginia's three-point shooting – among the best in the United States – holding the Mountaineers to 9-for-26 (38 percent) shooting from three-point range. The Hoyas shot 58 percent from the floor and outrebounded West Virginia 35-19, outscoring the Mountaineers 17–0 during one stretch in the first half to jump out to a double-digit lead they never relinquished. Shooting 79 percent from the floor in the first half, Georgetown led 37–20 at halftime and opened the second half with a 7–0 run to take a 44–20 lead. Roy Hibbert went 12-for-13 (92.3 percent) from the free-throw line and had 20 points, Jeff Green had 15 points, and Jonathan Wallace scored 14.

In the next game, Jeff Green had 19 points and DaJuan Summers had 11 in a tight victory over Villanova that required Georgetown to come from a 37–29 deficit to eke out a 58–55 win. Jessie Sapp had 16 points and made a three-point shot from half-court as the buzzer sounded to end the first half. The win gave Georgetown its first nine-game winning streak since 2003–04. The Hoyas extended their winning streak to 10 – their first 10-game streak since they opened the 2003-04 season 10-0 – with a win at Cincinnati that saw Jeff Green score 21 points and Jonathan Wallace contribute 17.

Three days after beating Cincinnati, No. 12 Georgetown again faced a ranked opponent, No. 10 Pittsburgh, at the Verizon Center, with a chance to climb into first place in the Big East. In a ragged game in which both sides had poor outside shooting and committed more than their share of turnovers, the score stood at 49–49 when Georgetown went on an 8–2 run that ultimately clinched a 61–53 upset win and sole possession of first place for Georgetown. Jonathan Wallace scored 17 points, Jeff Green had 14, and Roy Hibbert added 12.

The win over Pittsburgh gave Georgetown 11 straight wins, its longest winning streak since an 11-victory run in 1995, but the streak came to end at Syracuse two days later, as the Orange used a 17–0 run in the second half to upset the No. 9 Hoyas, 72–58. DaJuan Summers and Patrick Ewing Jr., each scored 10 points, the only Hoyas to reach double digits. In the final game of the season, Georgetown bounced back, beating Connecticut to win the Big East regular-season championship for the first time since 1989. Against Connecticut, Roy Hibbert had another double-double (18 points and 12 rebounds), Jeff Green scored 14 points, and Patrick Ewing Jr., added 12.

Georgetown ended the regular season ranked No. 9, with a 13–3 record in the Big East Conference – their best Big East record since 1989 – and 23–6 overall.

=== Big East tournament ===
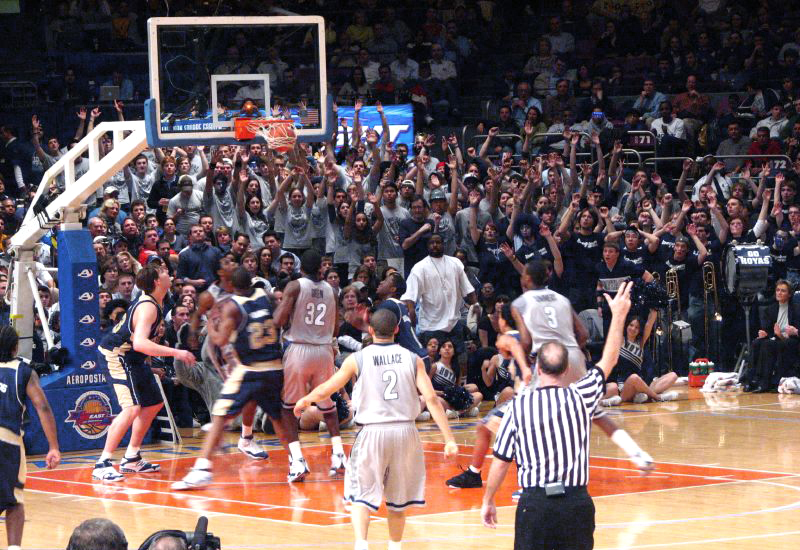
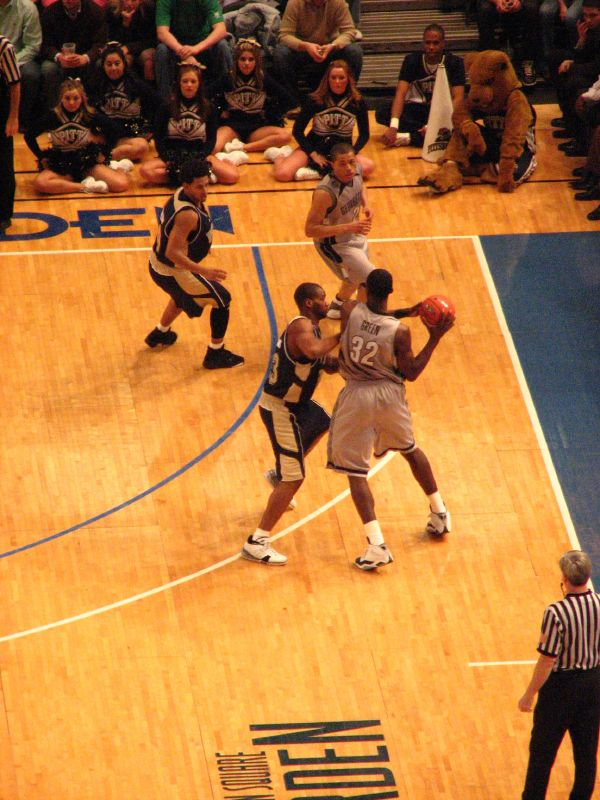
Georgetown meets Pittsburgh in the Big East tournament championship game at Madison Square Garden on March 10, 2007. LEFT: Georgetown scores. RIGHT: Jeff Green (at right center) attempts to pass to Jonathan Wallace (at upper right).

With a No. 1 seed in the Big East tournament for the first time since 1989, Georgetown had a bye in the first round. In the quarterfinals, the Hoyas faced Villanova, winners of four straight. The Hoyas outscored the Wildcats 14–0 to start the game, Villanova's first points not coming until 7:20 had elapsed in the first half. A 12–0 Georgetown run followed, creating a 26–2 lead over Villanova with 9:28 left in the first half. Georgetown outshot Villanova 57 percent to 27 percent in the first half, led by 25 points three times, and had a 37–18 advantage at halftime. Villanova attempted a comeback, finishing a 14–2 run with 5:29 elapsed in the second half to close to a ten-point deficit, but then the Hoyas increased their lead to 17. Georgetown still led 56–45 with 1:43 left in the game, but the Wildcats closed to a six-point deficit with 49 seconds left and then to 59-54 with 27.9 seconds remaining. Georgetown held on to win 62–57. Roy Hibbert had 14 points in the game, Jeff Green had 12 points and nine rebounds, and Jonathan Wallace and DaJuan Summers each contributed 10 points.

The Hoyas advanced to play No. 20 Notre Dame, winners of six straight, in a semifinal game the following day. The Fighting Irish jumped out to a 37–21 lead with 7:37 left in the first half, but Georgetown went on a 10–2 run and reduced Notre Dame's advantage to 46–44 at halftime. Patrick Ewing Jr., scored six points in the first 1:48 of the second half to give Georgetown its first lead at 50–49, and Jeff Green contributed seven points during a 9–0 run that gave the Hoyas a 76–69 lead with five minutes left in the game, but Notre Dame replied with a nine unanswered points of its own to take a 78–76 lead with 2:54 left. Wallace and Hibbert then scored on consecutive jump shots to put the Hoyas back in front, 80–78, and Summers stretched the lead to 82-79 by sinking two free throws. Notre Dame tied the game at 82–82 with 40.5 seconds left, but then Jeff Green sank the winning basket with 13 seconds remaining. Notre Dame guard Russell Carter′s three-pointer missed with six seconds left, and Jonathan Wallace grabbed the rebound and heaved the ball down the court to preserve the Hoyas′ 84–82 win, their fourth consecutive victory over the Fighting Irish. Green had a double-double, scoring a new career high of 30 points and grabbing 12 rebounds, while Summers contributed 18 points. Ewing had his best game since transferring from Indiana, shooting 7-for-11 from the field and scoring a career-high 18 points, and Jonathan Wallace scored 10.

Winners of 14 of their previous 15 games, the Hoyas reached the Big East tournament final for the first time since 1996, facing No. 13 Pittsburgh. Pittsburgh led 2–0 at the beginning of the game, but shot 26.2 percent from the field and never led again. Georgetown had a 13–11 lead with 9:04 left in the first half and then went on a 15-2 run to take a 28–13 lead with 2:58 remaining. At halftime, the Hoyas led 32–17, and in the second half the Panthers never got closer than 13 points as Georgetown cruised to a 65–42 victory, winning the Big East tournament for the first time since 1989 and seventh time overall – and, as it turned out, for the last time in the original Big East Conference. Jeff Green scored a game-high 21 points and was selected as the tournament's Most Valuable Player, while Hibbert had a double-double (14 points and 11 rebounds).

=== NCAA tournament ===
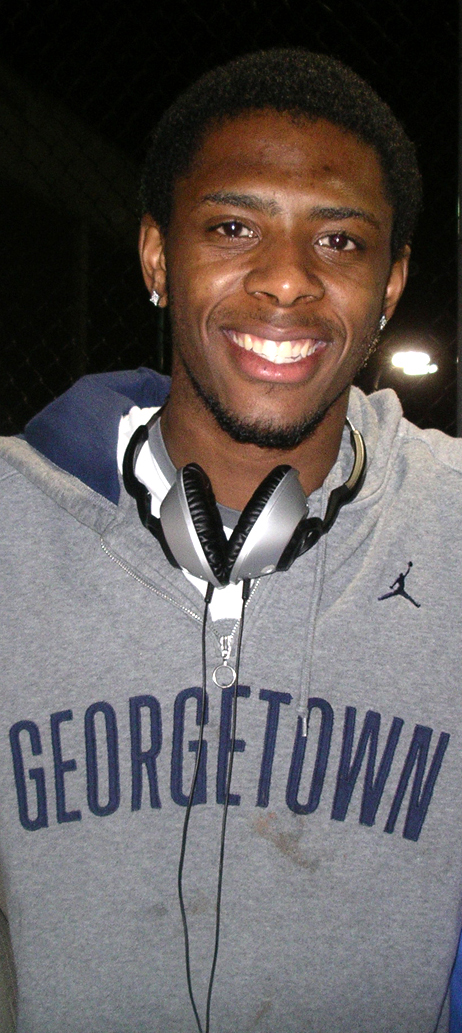
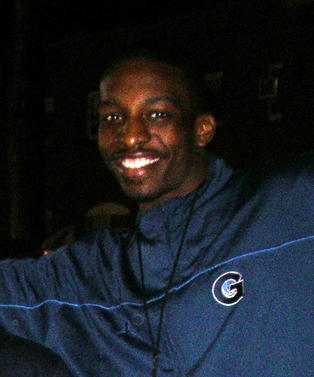
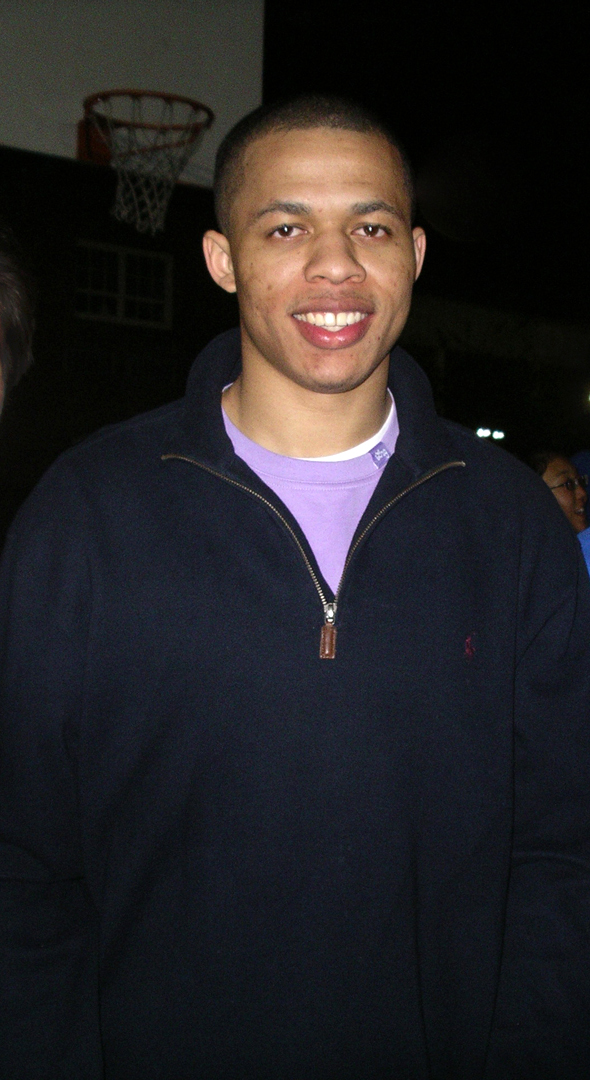
Patrick Ewing Jr. (left), Jeff Green (center), and Jonathan Wallace (right) visit with Georgetown students camped out for NCAA Final Four tickets on March 27, 2007.

Winning the Big East tournament gave Georgetown an automatic 2007 NCAA tournament bid and its first NCAA tournament appearances in consecutive years since 1996 and 1997. With a 26–6 record, the Hoyas were seeded second in the East Regional, their highest seed since 1996. Meeting 15th-seed Belmont in the first game, the Hoyas got off to s slow start, with the Bruins taking an 11–4 lead to start the game, but then Georgetown scored 11 straight points during a 20–4 run, kept Belmont from scoring a field goal for eight minutes, and took the lead for good, 13–11, with 11:23 left in the first half. Jessie Sapp, who had been shooting 28 percent from three-point range for the season and in his past six games had failed to score in double figures, shot 12-for-42 (28.6 percent) from the floor, had a career-high four three-pointers and a career-high 20 points in the game. Jeff Green scored 15 points, Roy Hibbert had a double-double (10 points and 13 rebounds), and Georgetown got an easy 80–55 victory, the 17th time they had won their first-round game in their past 18 NCAA tournament appearances.

In the second round, Georgetown faced seventh-seed Boston College, a former Big East rival, in a very physical game. The Hoyas, entering the game second in the United States in field goal percentage at 51 percent, shot only 38 percent during the game, and the Eagles led 30–26 at halftime and stretched their led to 39–31 early in the second half. Then the Hoyas went on a 10–0 run to take the lead, 41–39, with 11:44 left in the game. Georgetown took the lead for good at 46–44 with 8:03 remaining, but the game stayed close, with the Eagles trailing by no more than four points and by as few as one. During the final minute and a half, the Hoyas drew fouls and made critical free throws to come away with a 62–55 win. Hibbert, who had a double-double (17 points and 12 rebounds), scored 15 of his points in the second half. Jeff Green also had a double-double (11 points and 12 rebounds), while Jonathan Wallace contributed 15 points.

In the East Regional semifinals – their second consecutive appearance in the "Sweet Sixteen" – the Hoyas faced sixth-seeded Vanderbilt, a team Georgetown had defeated early in the season. The Commodores staked themselves to a 32–24 lead at halftime, but the Hoyas battled back in the second half, with DaJuan Summers making three clutch three-pointers, and neither team ever led by more than four points during the final 17 minutes of play, a stretch in which the game saw eight lead changes and four ties. Hibbert fouled out with 3:28 left to play, a major blow to the Hoyas in a tight game, but the Commodores were unable to take much advantage of his absence, and a Jonathan Wallace jump shot put the Hoyas ahead 64–61 with 1:03 left in the game. With 48.8 seconds to go, Vanderbilt's Derrick Byars sank two free throws to make it 64–63, followed by two free throws by Dan Cage with 19.6 seconds remaining to put the Commodores ahead 65–64. But Jeff Green spoiled Vanderbilt's upset bid when he banked in an off-balance shot with 2.5 seconds left to give Georgetown a 66–65 victory. Hibbert had a double-double (12 points and 10 rebounds), while Summers scored 15 points and had seven rebounds in the game, and Green also contributed 15 points.

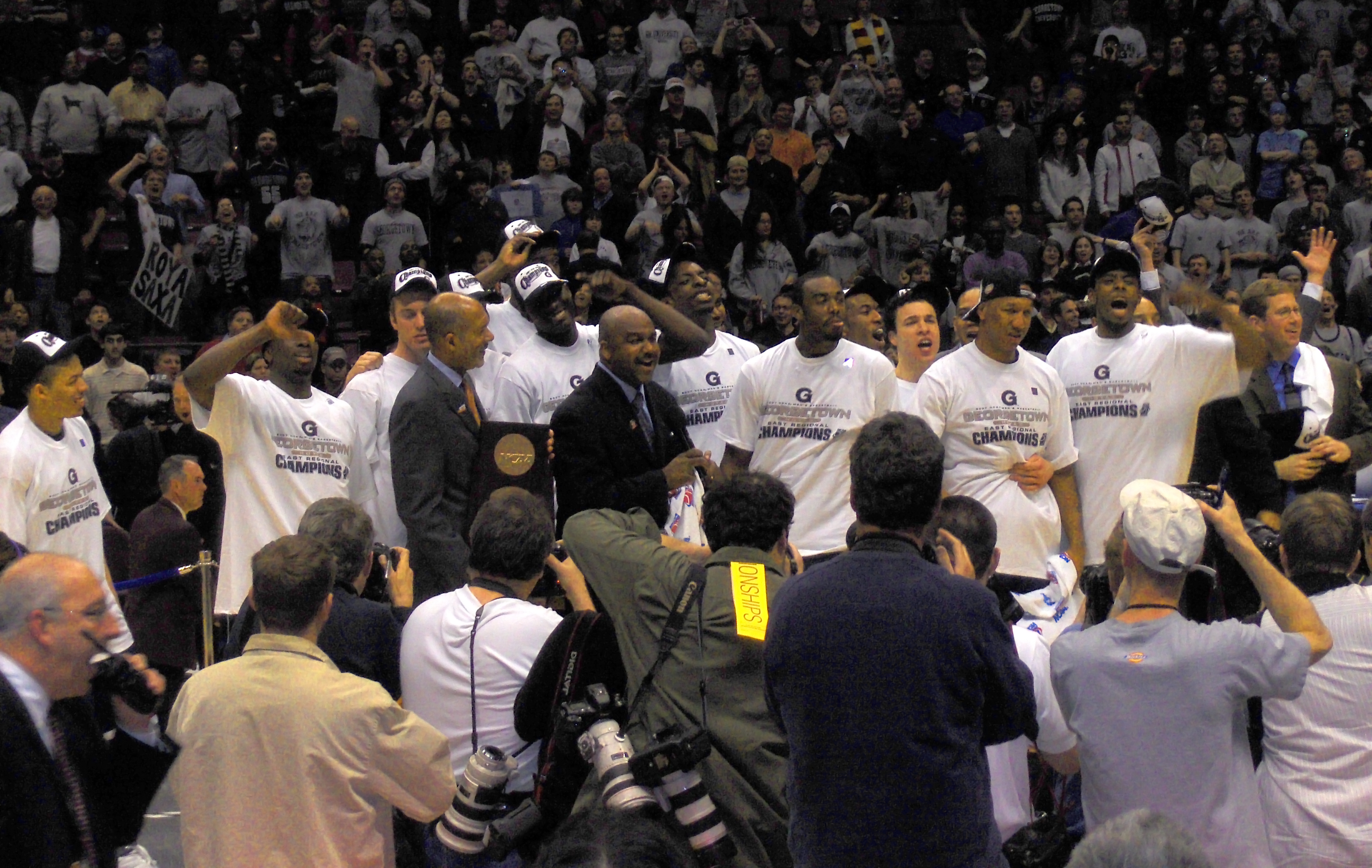
Presentation to the team of the trophy for the East Region championship in the NCAA tournament at the IZOD Center on March 25, 2007.

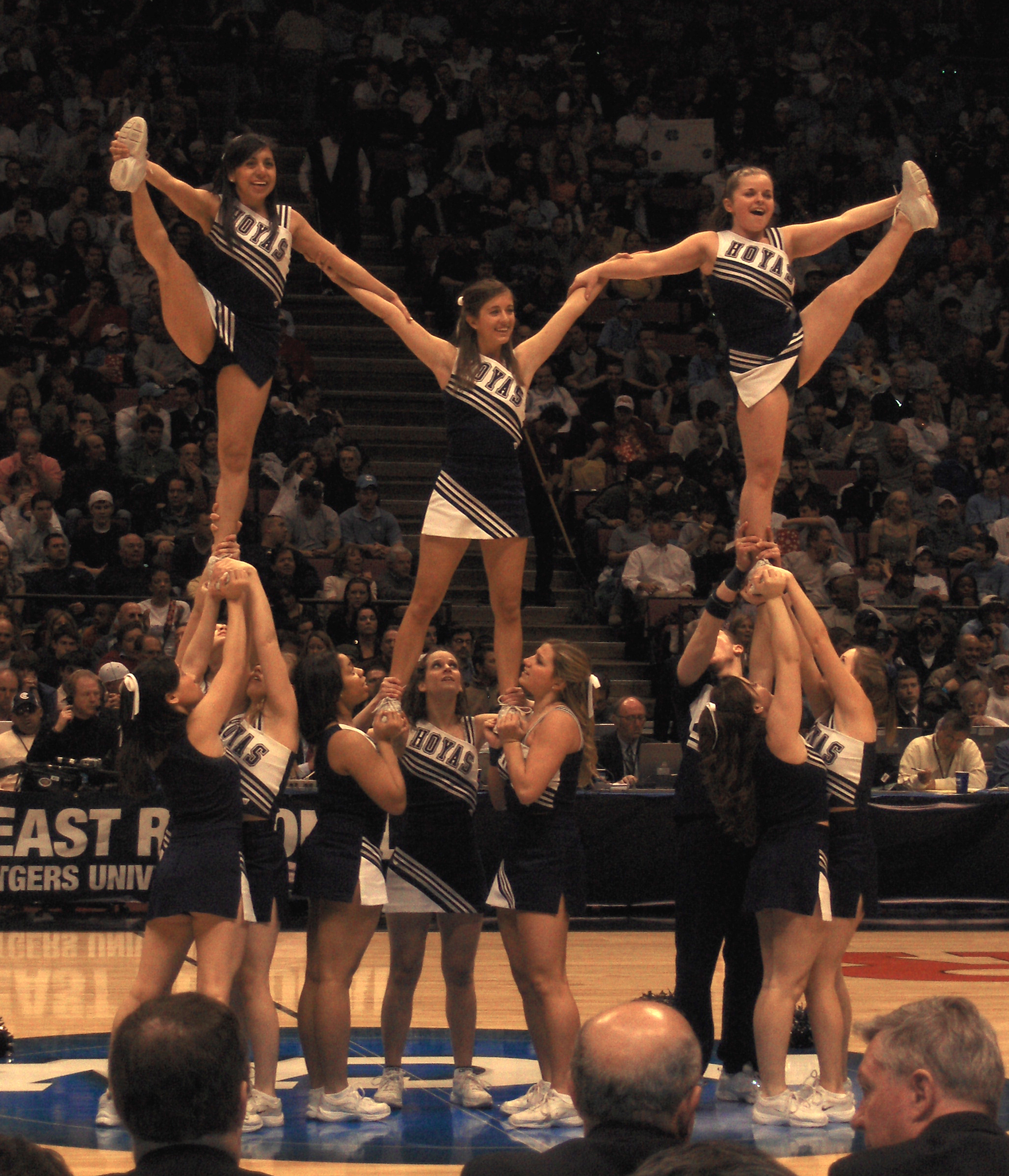
Georgetown cheerleaders perform at the IZOD Center in East Rutherford, New Jersey, during the Hoyas′ NCAA tournament game against North Carolina on March 25, 2007.

The win over Vanderbilt put the Hoyas in the East Regional final – their first appearance in the "Elite Eight" since 1996 – where they met the region's top seed, North Carolina. It was the first postseason game between the teams since the 1981–82 Tar Heels win over the 1981–82 Hoyas 25 years earlier in the 1982 NCAA Championship Game. Georgetown jumped out to a 22–17 lead with 13:43 left in the first half, but the Tar Heels had reduced the deficit to 22-20 when a technical foul on John Thompson III for walking out of the coaching box allowed North Carolina to tie the game at 22–22 with two free throws. The momentum then shifted in North Carolina's favor, with the Tar Heels leading by as many as 10 points and having a 50–44 advantage at halftime. In the second half, North Carolina stretched its lead to 69–58 with 12:23 left to play. Georgetown had closed to six points behind when North Carolina's Deon Thompson tipped in a two-pointer to give the Tar Heels a 73–65 lead with 9:53 left in the second half. But then the Tar Heels′ offense collapsed, making only one more field goal – a two-point layup by Tyler Hansbrough with 1:41 left in the second half – during the next 15 minutes of play in the second half and overtime combined. The Hoyas meanwhile chipped away at the lead until Jonathan Wallace tied the game at 81–81 with a three-point jumper with 32 seconds left in the half. In overtime, the Hoyas scored 14 straight points to take a 95–81 lead while North Carolina's field goal drought continued until Ty Lawson scored North Carolina's only overtime points with a three-point jumper to make the score 95–84 with eight seconds left. The Tar Heels had missed 21 of their final 23 field goal attempts and Georgetown won 96–84, with all five Hoya starters scoring in double digits: Jeff Green had 22 points and nine rebounds, DaJuan Summers had 20 points and six rebounds, Jonathan Wallace scored 19, Jessie Sapp contributed 15, and Roy Hibbert had a double-double with 13 points and 11 rebounds.

The Hoyas, winners of 19 of their last 20 games, advanced to the Final Four for the first time since 1985 to meet No. 1 Ohio State, winner of 21 straight. The game featured a much-anticipated match-up of elite college centers – Ohio State's Greg Oden and Georgetown's Roy Hibbert – and during the game Oden had 13 points and nine rebounds, while Hibbert scored 19 points and pulled down six rebounds. But both centers got into early foul trouble and spent a great deal of time on the bench, with Oden playing for only three minutes in the first half and for only 20 in the game, while Hibbert played for only 24 minutes. Ohio State took better advantage of Hibbert's absences than Georgetown did of Oden's. Jonathan Wallace scored 19 points, Jessie Sapp contributed 10 points, and Jeff Green grabbed 12 rebounds, but Green – who entered the game averaging 15.8 points per game during the tournament – scored only nine points, going almost 17 minutes in the first half and 14 minutes in the second half without taking a shot. DaJuan Summers, who had scored 25 points in the previous two games, managed only three against the Buckeyes, and the Georgetown bench did not score a single point. Ohio State outrebounded the Hoyas 37–30 and scored 22 points off 14 Hoya turnovers. When Oden went to the bench with two fouls only three minutes into the game, not to return until the second half, Georgetown was leading 5–3, but the Buckeyes then went on an 11–2 run over the next six minutes to take a 14–7 lead. Thanks to Hibbert's work inside, Georgetown closed to a 15-14 deficit, but then Hibbert had to sit with two fouls, and Ohio State extended its lead to 25-17 with 3:32 left in the first half. Leading 27-23 at halftime, Ohio State trailed only once more, at 34-33 with 15:56 left in the game. The score was tied 44–44 with 9:44 left in the game, but Hibbert had to sit with four fouls only 20 seconds later, and Oden then helped the Buckeyes jump out to a 51–44 lead with 6:37 left from which the Hoyas never recovered. Ohio State won 67–60, advancing to the national championship game for the first time since 1962 and bringing Georgetown's season to an end.

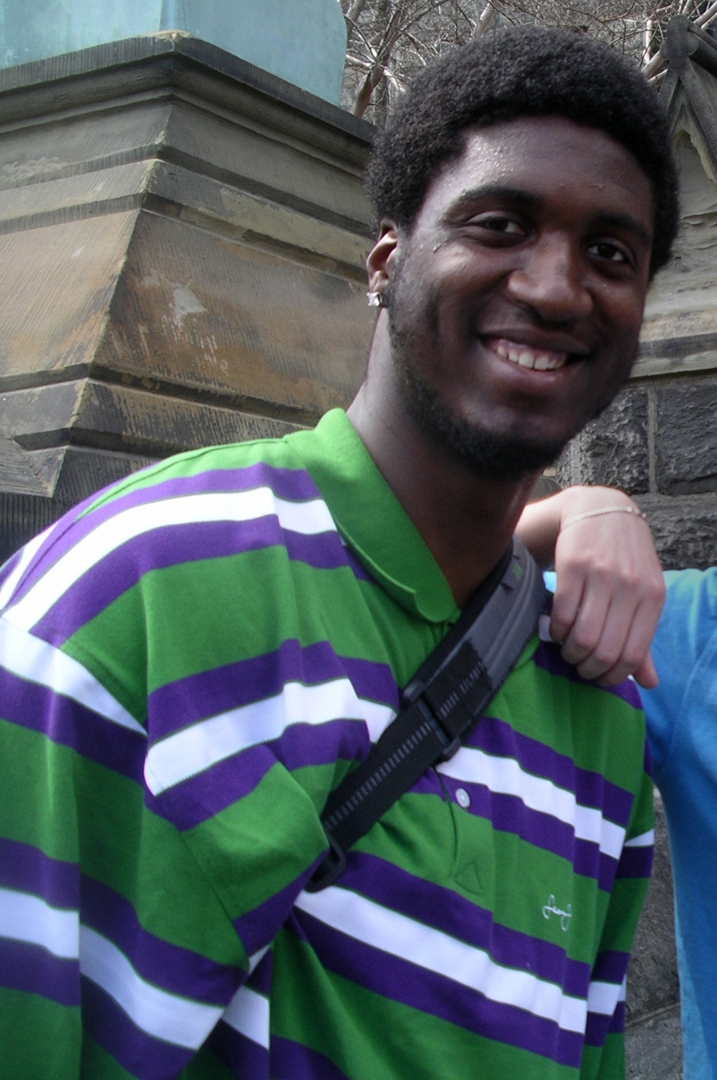
Roy Hibbert on campus after the celebration of the team's season on April 2, 2007.

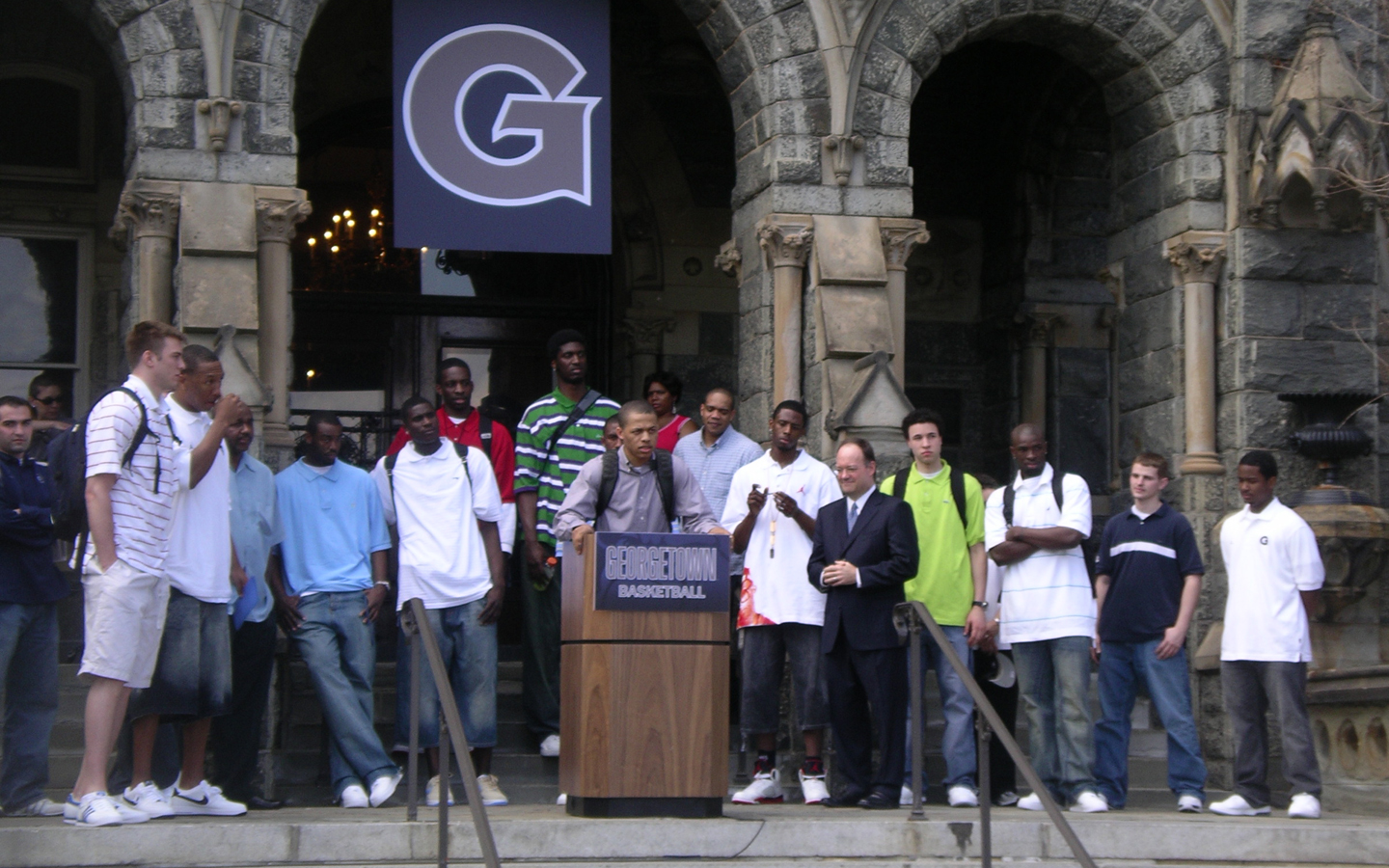
The team gathered in front of Healy Hall with university president John J. DeGioia on April 2, 2007.

For the season, Roy Hibbert shot 67.1 percent from the field and finished with 12.9 points per game, while Jonathan Wallace shot 50.7 percent from the field overall and 49.0 percent from three-point range, averaging 11.4 points per game. DaJuan Summers averaged 9.2 and Jessie Sapp 9.1 points per game. Jeff Green, sometimes criticized for being too unselfish with the ball and not shooting enough, nonetheless finished the season shooting 51.3 percent from the field and 37.5 percent from three-point range, averaging a team-leading 14.2 points per game. Selected as the 2007 Big East Conference Men's Basketball Player of the Year, Jeff Green opted to forego his senior year of college and entered the National Basketball Association draft; he was drafted by the Boston Celtics, who traded him to the Seattle SuperSonics.

After the season, Assistant Coach Sydney Johnson left the team to become the head coach at Princeton University. Assistant Coach Kevin Broadus also left to become the head coach at SUNY-Binghamton. Sophomore forward Octavius Spann announced in May that he would leave Georgetown and transfer to Marshall.

Georgetown finished the season ranked No. 8 in the Associated Press Poll and No.4 in the Coaches Poll, the team's highest finish in the AP Poll since 1996 and highest in the Coaches Poll since 1989. It was the best season of John Thompson III's 13-year tenure as Georgetown's head coach. In his remaining nine seasons at the helm, the Hoyas would appear in the NCAA tournament six more times, but would win only three NCAA tournament games, and never would advance beyond the tournament's first weekend.

== Roster ==
After sitting out a season following his transfer to Georgetown from Indiana, junior forward Patrick Ewing Jr., the son of Patrick Ewing, joined the team this season. He became only the second son of a former player to play for Georgetown, and the first to do so since Ed Hargaden Jr. – the son of Ed Hargaden, Georgetown's first All-American and star of the 1932–33, 1933–34, and 1934–35 teams – played during the 1957–58, 1958–59, and 1959–60 seasons.

2006–07 Georgetown Hoyas men's basketball team
Players
Coaches

Pos.	#	Name	Height	Weight	Year	Previous school	Hometown
F	1	Vernon Macklin	6 ft 9 in (2.06 m)	227 lb (103 kg)	Fr	Hargrave Military Academy	Portsmouth, Virginia
G	2	Jonathan Wallace	6 ft 1 in (1.85 m)	188 lb (85 kg)	Jr	Sparkman High School	Harvest, Alabama
F	3	DaJuan Summers	6 ft 8 in (2.03 m)	241 lb (109 kg)	Fr	McDonogh School	Accokeek, Maryland
F	4	Kenny Izzo	6 ft 8 in (2.03 m)	244 lb (111 kg)	Sr	Fenwick High School	Chicago, Illinois
G	5	Jeremiah Rivers	6 ft 4 in (1.93 m)	205 lb (93 kg)	Fr	Winter Park High School	Winter Park, Florida
G	21	Jessie Sapp	6 ft 3 in (1.91 m)	205 lb (93 kg)	So	National Christian Academy	New York City, New York
G/F	22	Tyler Crawford (C)	6 ft 3 in (1.91 m)	205 lb (93 kg)	Jr	Robert E. Lee High School	Stuarts Draft, Virginia
F	24	Octavius Spann	6 ft 6 in (1.98 m)	220 lb (100 kg)	So	Banneker High School	College Park, Georgia
F	32	Jeff Green	6 ft 9 in (2.06 m)	235 lb (107 kg)	Jr	Northwestern High School	Hyattsville, Maryland
F	33	Patrick Ewing Jr.	6 ft 8 in (2.03 m)	238 lb (108 kg)	Jr	National Christian Academy	Marietta, Georgia
F	52	Sead Dizdarevic	6 ft 9 in (2.06 m)	240 lb (109 kg)	Sr	Highlands High School	Bijelo Polje, Montenegro
C	55	Roy Hibbert	7 ft 2 in (2.18 m)	278 lb (126 kg)	Jr	Georgetown Preparatory School	Adelphi, Maryland

Head coach

John Thompson III

Assistant coach(es)

Robert Burke
Kevin Broadus
Sydney Johnson

Legend

- (C) Team captain
- (S) Suspended
- (I) Ineligible
- (W) Walk-on
- Injured
- Current redshirt

Roster
Last update: December 8, 2010

== Rankings ==
Ranking movement Legend: ██ Improvement in ranking. ██ Decrease in ranking. ██ Not ranked the previous week. RV=Others receiving votes.
Poll	Pre Nov 6	Wk 2 Nov 13	Wk 3 Nov 20	Wk 4 Nov 27	Wk 5 Dec 4	Wk 6 Dec 11	Wk 7 Dec 18	Wk 8 Dec 25	Wk 9 Jan 1	Wk 10 Jan 8	Wk 11 Jan 15	Wk 12 Jan 22	Wk 13 Jan 29	Wk 14 Feb 5	Wk 15 Feb 12	Wk 16 Feb 19	Wk 17 Feb 26	Wk 18 Mar 5	Post Wk 1 Mar 12	Final
AP	8	8	14	18	RV	RV	RV	RV	RV	RV	RV	RV	RV	22	14	12	9	9	8	(Note: No Associated Press Poll this week.)
Coaches	8	8	16	23	RV	RV	RV	RV	RV	RV	RV	RV	RV	23	16	12	10	9	8	4

== Schedule and results ==
Date time, TV	Rank^{#}	Opponent^{#}	Result	Record	Site (attendance) city, state
Regular season
November 11, 2006*; 12:00 p.m.	No. 8	Hartford	W 69–59	1–0	Verizon Center (9,654); Washington, DC
November 15, 2006*; 9:00 p.m., MASN	No. 8	at Vanderbilt	W 86–70	2–0	Memorial Gymnasium (12,414); Nashville, TN
November 19, 2006; 6:00 p.m.	No. 8	Old Dominion	L 62–75	2–1	McDonough Gymnasium (2,500); Washington, DC
November 22, 2006*; 7:30 p.m., ESPN360	No. 14	at Fairfield	W 73–60	3–1	Arena at Harbor Yard (5,627); Bridgeport, CT
November 27, 2006*; 7:30 p.m., MASN	No. 18	Ball State	W 69–54	4–1	Verizon Center (6,942); Washington, DC
November 29, 2006*; 7:00 p.m., ESPN360	No. 18	Oregon	L 50–57	4–2	Verizon Center (8,764); Washington, DC
December 2, 2006*; 7:00 p.m., ESPN2	No. 18	at No. 11 Duke	L 52–61	4–3	Cameron Indoor Stadium (9,314); Durham, NC
December 5, 2006*; 7:30 p.m.		James Madison	W 89–53	5–3	Verizon Center (6,837); Washington, DC
December 9, 2006*; 1:00 p.m.		Oral Roberts	W 73–58	6–3	Verizon Center (7,164); Washington, DC
December 16, 2006*; 7:30 p.m., MASN		Winston-Salem	W 76–32	7–3	McDonough Gymnasium (2,228); Washington, DC
December 20, 2006*; 7:30 p.m.		Towson	W 69–41	8–3	Verizon Center (5,654); Washington, DC
December 23, 2006*; 1:00 p.m., MASN		Navy	W 64–44	9–3	Verizon Center (7,143); Washington, DC
December 30, 2006*; 12:00 p.m., ESPN2		at Michigan	W 67–51	10–3	Crisler Arena (13,751); Ann Arbor, MI
January 6, 2007; 12:00 p.m., MASN		No. 17 Notre Dame	W 66–48	11–3 (1–0)	Verizon Center (15,506); Washington, DC
January 8, 2007; 8:00 p.m., ESPN		Villanova	L 52–56	11–4 (1–1)	Verizon Center (11,816); Washington, DC
January 13, 2007; 9:00 p.m., ESPN		at No. 7 Pittsburgh; ESPN College GameDay	L 69–74	11–5 (1–2)	Petersen Events Center (12,508); Pittsburgh, PA
January 17, 2007; 7:30 p.m., MASN		at Rutgers	W 68–54	12–5 (2–2)	Louis Brown Athletic Center (6,748); Piscataway, NJ
January 19, 2007; 7:30 p.m., MASN		at Seton Hall	W 74–58	13–5 (3–2)	IZOD Center (9,666); East Rutherford, NJ
January 24, 2007; 7:30 p.m., ESPN2		DePaul	W 66–52	14–5 (4–2)	Verizon Center (9,315); Washington, DC
January 27, 2007; 12:00 p.m., MASN		Cincinnati	W 82–67	15–5 (5–2)	Verizon Center (13,106); Washington, DC
February 1, 2007; 7:00 p.m., ESPN		at St. John's	W 72–48	16–5 (6–2)	Madison Square Garden (7,797); New York City, NY
February 7, 2007; 7:00 p.m., ESPN	No. 22	Louisville	W 73–65	17–5 (7–2)	Freedom Hall (20,030); Louisville, KY
February 10, 2007; 12:00 p.m., ESPN	No. 22	No. 11 Marquette	W 76–58	18–5 (8–2)	Verizon Center (17,867); Washington, DC
February 12, 2007; 8:00 p.m., MASN	No. 14	No. 23 West Virginia	W 71–53	19–5 (9–2)	Verizon Center (14,203); Washington, DC
February 17, 2007; 12:00 p.m., ESPN	No. 14	at Villanova	W 58–55	20–5 (10–2)	Wachovia Center (19,089); Philadelphia, PA
February 21, 2007; 7:00 p.m., MASN	No. 12	at Cincinnati	W 75–65	21–5 (11–2)	Fifth Third Arena (8,163); Cincinnati, OH
February 24, 2007; 2:00 p.m., CBS	No. 12	No. 10 Pittsburgh	W 61–53	22–5 (12–2)	Verizon Center (20,038); Washington, DC
February 26, 2007; 7:00 p.m., ESPN	No. 9	at Syracuse; Rivalry	L 58–72	22–6 (12–3)	Carrier Dome (26,287); Syracuse, NY
March 3, 2007; 12:00 p.m., CBS	No. 9	Connecticut; Rivalry	W 59–46	23–6 (13–3)	Verizon Center (18,764); Washington, DC
Big East tournament
March 8, 2007*; 12:00 p.m., ESPN	No. 9	vs. Villanova; Quarterfinal	W 62–57	24–6	Madison Square Garden (19,594); New York, NY
March 9, 2007*; 7:00 p.m., ESPN	No. 9	vs. No. 20 Notre Dame; Semifinal	W 84–82	25–6	Madison Square Garden (19,594); New York, NY
March 10, 2007*; 9:00 p.m., ESPN	No. 9	vs. No. 13 Pittsburgh; Final	W 65–42	26–6	Madison Square Garden (19,594); New York, NY
NCAA tournament
March 15, 2007*; 2:45 p.m., CBS	No. 8	vs. Belmont; First Round	W 80–55	27–6	Lawrence Joel Veterans Memorial Coliseum (14,148); Winston-Salem, NC
March 17, 2007*; 5:45 p.m., CBS	No. 8	vs. Boston College; Second Round	W 62–55	28–6	Lawrence Joel Veterans Memorial Coliseum (14,148); Winston-Salem, NC
March 23, 2007*; 7:27 p.m., CBS	No. 8	vs. Vanderbilt; Sweet Sixteen	W 66–65	29–6	IZOD Center (19,557); East Rutherford, NJ
March 25, 2007*; 5:05 p.m., CBS	No. 8	vs. No. 4 North Carolina; Elite Eight	W 96–84 ^{OT}	30–6	IZOD Center (19,557); East Rutherford, NJ
March 31, 2007*; 6:07 p.m., CBS	No. 8	vs. No. 1 Ohio State; Final Four	L 60–67	30–7	Georgia Dome (53,510); Atlanta, GA
*Non-conference game. ^{#}Rankings from AP Poll. (#) Tournament seedings in parentheses.

== Awards and honors ==
=== Big East Conference honors ===
Weekly honors
Honors	Player	Position	Date awarded	Ref.
Big East Player of the Week	Roy Hibbert	C	January 29, 2007	
Big East Player of the Week	Roy Hibbert	C	February 12, 2007	
Big East Player of the Week	Jeff Green	F	February 19, 2007	

Postseason honors
Honors	Player	Position	Date awarded	Ref.
Big East Player of the Year	Jeff Green	F	March 6, 2007	
All-Big East First Team	Jeff Green	F	March 5, 2007	
All-Big East First Team	Roy Hibbert	C	March 5, 2007	
All-Big East Honorable Mention	Jonathan Wallace	G	March 5, 2007	
All-Big East Rookie Team	DaJuan Summers	F	March 5, 2007	
