= West Englewood =

West Englewood may refer to:

- West Englewood, Chicago, Illinois, United States
- West Englewood, New Jersey, United States
