= 1957–58 Georgetown Hoyas men's basketball team =

American college basketball season

1957–58 Georgetown Hoyas men's basketball
- Conference: Independent
- Record: 10–11
- Head coach: Tom Nolan (2nd season)
- Assistant coach: Tommy O'Keefe (2nd season)
- Captains: John Clark; Ken Pichette
- Home arena: McDonough Gymnasium

The 1957–58 Georgetown Hoyas men's basketball team represented Georgetown University during the 1957–58 NCAA University Division college basketball season. Tom Nolan coached them in his second season as head coach. The team was an independent and played its home games at McDonough Gymnasium on the Georgetown campus in Washington, D.C. It finished with a record of 10–11 and had no post-season play.

== Season recap ==
Sophomore forward Tom McCloskey had been the Washington, D.C., high school all-city Most Valuable Player before arriving at Georgetown in the fall of 1956 for a season on the freshman team. He joined the varsity team this season. He scored a career-high 24 points against Loyola of Maryland in the season opener, and by the middle of January 1958 he had scored in double figures in six of the team's seven games. McCloskey and junior forward Jack Nies were averaging a combined 22 points per game by February.

McCloskey's and Nies's season came to a sudden end when they were among four players Georgetown placed on academic suspension for the rest of the season even though they remained academically eligible under National Collegiate Athletic Association (NCAA) standards. McCloskey's abbreviated season ended with him averaging 12.4 points and 7.6 rebounds per game.

Senior forward Ken Pichette carried the weight as the team's main scorer after the departure of McCloskey and Nies, averaging 19 points per game after they were suspended, not counting 31 points he scored in the mid-February exhibition game against the New York Athletic Club. However, the suspensions crippled the team, and it lost six of its last eight games and eight of its last ten to finish with a record of 10–11. It was not ranked in the Top 20 in the Associated Press Poll or Coaches' Poll at any time.

== Roster ==
Sophomore guard Ed Hargaden Jr., joined the team this year as the first second-generation Georgetown men's basketball player, his father, guard Ed Hargaden, having been a standout on the 1932–33, 1933–34, and 1934–35 teams. He also was the only second-generation player in school history until center Patrick Ewing's son, forward Patrick Ewing Jr., joined the team in the 2006–07 season.

Sophomore forward Henry Rojas left the team during the season, and sophomore guard Jim Brown joined the team to replace him. They both wore No. 21.

#	Name	Height	Weight (lbs.)	Position	Class	Hometown	Previous Team(s)
4	Jack Nies	5"10"	N/A	F	Jr.	Jersey City, NJ, U.S.	St. Peter's Preparatory School
5	Dick Razzetti	6'3"	N/A	G	So.	Westbury, NY, U.S.	Chaminade HS
11	Bob Moses	N/A	N/A	G	So.	Syracuse, NY, U.S.	Christian Brothers Academy
12	Jack Rafferty	N/A	N/A	G	So.	Sayville, NY, U.S.	Seton Hall HS
17	Ken Pichette	6'3"	185	F	Sr.	Binghamton, NY, U.S.	Central HS
20	Jim Oravec	6"2"	N/A	G	Jr.	Palmerton, PA, U.S.	Palmerton HS
21	Henry Rojas	N/A	N/A	F	So.	Stamford, CT, U.S.	N/A
21	Jim Brown	N/A	N/A	G	So.	N/A	N/A
22	Ed Hargaden Jr.	6"0"	N/A	G	So.	Baltimore, MD, U.S.	Loyola HS
23	Joe Titus	N/A	N/A	F	Sr.	Bradford, PA, U.S.	Bradford Area HS
24	Tom McCloskey	6'1"	178	F	So.	Washington, DC, U.S.	Gonzaga College HS
25	John Clark	6'2"	N/A	G	Sr.	Binghamton, NY, U.S.	Saint Patrick HS
30	Randolph "Max" Schmeling	6'9"	N/A	C	Jr.	Spring Grove, PA, U.S.	St. Francis HS
32	Kevin Henessey	N/A	N/A	G	Sr.	N/A	N/A
N/A	Ed Frampton	N/A	N/A	G	Sr.	Tuckahoe, NY, U.S.	Horace Greeley HS

== 1957–58 schedule and results ==
Note (Note: Sources all agree that Georgetown's record for the season was 10–11, but the schedule posted by The Georgetown Basketball History Project – which also states that the overall record was 10–11 – shows only 20 games played, consisting of 9 wins and 11 losses. The 2012-2013 Georgetown Men's Basketball Media Guide, p. 61, lists 21 games – 10 wins and 11 losses. The extra game listed by the media guide is a 76–60 victory against Muhlenberg on an unspecified date, apparently in January 1958. For the preceding 1956–57 season, The Georgetown Basketball History Project and other sources agree that Georgetown finished with an 11-11 record, but the Project lists 23 games (12 wins and 11 losses) played. It lists a 76–60 win over Muhlenberg in the 1956–57 season, on January 18, 1957, but the media guide lists no Muhlenberg game that season. It appears that the Georgetown Basketball History Project is mistaken in showing the 76-60 win over Muhlenberg as taking place in January 1957 and that it actually occurred a year later on January 18, 1958. ShrpSports.com confirms Georgetown winning at Muhlenberg 76-60 on January 18, 1958.)

Date time, TV	Rank^{#}	Opponent^{#}	Result	Record	Site city, state
Regular Season
Wed., Dec. 4, 1957 no, no		Loyola Maryland	W 76–51	1-0	McDonough Gymnasium; Washington, DC
Sat., Dec. 7, 1957 no, no		at Princeton	L 68–87	1-1	Dillon Gymnasium; Princeton, NJ
Wed., Dec. 11, 1957 no, no		Mount St. Mary's	W 76–69	2-1	McDonough Gymnasium; Washington, DC
Fri., Dec. 16, 1957 no, no		Baltimore	W 103–65	3-1	McDonough Gymnasium; Washington, DC
Mon., Dec. 16, 1957 no, no		Catholic	W 84–58	4-1	McDonough Gymnasium; Washington, DC
Thu., Dec. 19, 1957 no, no		Saint Peter's	W 81–66	5-1	McDonough Gymnasium; Washington, DC
Wed., Jan. 8, 1958 no, no		at George Washington	L 64–77	5-2	Fort Myer Gymnasium; Fort Myer, VA
Sat., Jan. 11, 1958 no, no		American	W 89–78	6-2	McDonough Gymnasium; Washington, DC
Tue., Jan. 14, 1958 no, no		Maryland	L 45–55	6-3	McDonough Gymnasium; Washington, DC
Fri., Jan. 17, 1958 no, no		at La Salle	W 76–69	7-3	Palestra; Philadelphia, PA
Sat., Jan. 18, 1958 no, no		at Muhlenberg	W 76–60	8-3	Memorial Hall; Allentown, PA
Fri., Jan. 31, 1958 no, no		at Syracuse; Rivalry	L 46–62	8-4	Onondaga War Memorial; Syracuse, NY
Sat., Feb. 1, 1958 no, no		at Scranton	L 68–96	8-5	Watres Armory; Scranton, PA
Wed., Feb. 5, 1958 no, no		Richmond	L 65–67	8-6	McDonough Gymnasium; Washington, DC
Sat., Feb. 8, 1958 no, no		at Fordham	L 45–82	8-7	Rose Hill Gymnasium; Bronx, NY
Wed., Feb. 12, 1958 no, no		at Navy	L 73–98	8-8	Halsey Field House; Annapolis, MD
Fri., Feb. 14, 1958 no, no		at New York Athletic Club	W 82–77 ^{OT}	exhibition	New York Athletic Club Gymnasium; New York, NY
Sat., Feb. 15, 1958 no, no		at Seton Hall	W 66–65	9-8	Walsh Gymnasium; South Orange, NJ
Wed., Feb. 19, 1958 no, no		George Washington	L 78–80	9-9	McDonough Gymnasium; Washington, DC
Sat., Feb. 22, 1958 no, no		New York University	W 91–72	10-9	McDonough Gymnasium; Washington, DC
Wed., Feb. 26, 1958 no, no		at Maryland	L 45–56	10-10	Cole Field House; College Park, MD
Sat., Mar. 1, 1958 no, no		St. Joseph's	L 67–70	10-11	McDonough Gymnasium; Washington, DC
*Non-conference game. ^{#}Rankings from AP Poll. (#) Tournament seedings in parentheses.
