= 1933–34 Georgetown Hoyas men's basketball team =

American college basketball season

1933–34 Georgetown Hoyas men's basketball
- Conference: Eastern Intercollegiate Conference
- Record: 12–11 (5-5 EIC)
- Head coach: Fred Mesmer (3rd season)
- Captain: Tom Carolan
- Home arena: Tech Gymnasium

1933–34 Eastern Intercollegiate Conference men's basketball standings
	Conf.				Overall
Team	W		L	PCT	W		L	PCT
Pittsburgh	8	–	0	1.000	18	–	4	.818
West Virginia	7	–	3	.700	14	–	5	.737
Georgetown	5	–	5	.500	12	–	11	.522
Temple	5	–	5	.500	9	–	12	.429
Carnegie Tech	2	–	7	.222	1	–	8	.111
Bucknell	0	–	7	.000	2	–	16	.111

The 1933–34 Georgetown Hoyas men's basketball team represented Georgetown University during the 1933–34 NCAA college basketball season. Fred Mesmer coached it in his third season as head coach. The team was a member of the Eastern Intercollegiate Conference (EIC) and played its home games at Tech Gymnasium on the campus of McKinley Technical High School in Washington, D.C. The team was the first of two winning teams during Mesmer's seven-season tenure, finishing with a record of 12–11 overall, 5–5 in the EIC.

== Season recap ==
Junior forward Ed Hargaden emerged as Georgetown's star player this season, especially during the latter part of the schedule. He scored 18 of the Hoyas' 30 points against Canisius, 15 of their 27 in an EIC game at Pittsburgh, 20 of their 53 points in a victory over Loyola of Maryland, and 15 of their 32 in a 32–28 win over EIC rival Carnegie Tech in the season finale. He finished the season with an average of 10.1 points per game – a considerable achievement in a low-scoring era – and was Georgetown's leading scorer for the second straight year, as he would be in all three seasons of his varsity career.

The team's 12–11 record gave Georgetown its best record since the 1929–30 season and its only winning record between the 1929–30 and 1936–37 seasons.

Hargaden's son, guard Ed Hargaden Jr., would become the first second-generation Georgetown men's basketball player, playing for Georgetown on the 1957–58, 1958–59, and 1959–60 teams. The Hargadens would be the only father and son to play for the Hoyas until center Patrick Ewing's son, forward Patrick Ewing Jr., joined the team in the 2006–07 season.

== Roster ==
This was the first season in which Georgetown players wore numbers on their jerseys.

#	Name	Height	Weight (lbs.)	Position	Class	Hometown	Previous Team(s)
5	John "Jake" Young	N/A	N/A	F	Jr.	N/A	N/A
9	Johnny "Jack" Crowley	N/A	N/A	G	Sr.	N/A	N/A
14	Leon Esenstadt	N/A	N/A	F	Sr.	N/A	N/A
16	Joe Corless	N/A	N/A	G	Jr.	N/A	N/A
18	Ed Hargaden	N/A	N/A	F	Jr.	Syracuse, NY, U.S.	Christian Brothers Academy
60	Charley Parcells	5'11"	N/A	F	Jr.	Hackensack, NJ, U.S.	Hackensack HS
N/A	Tom Carolan	N/A	N/A	F	Sr.	Syracuse, NY, U.S.	Christian Brothers Academy
N/A	Bill Connors	N/A	N/A	G	Sr.	N/A	N/A
N/A	James Magner	N/A	N/A	F	So.	N/A	N/A
N/A	Jerry O'Connor	N/A	N/A	C	Sr.	N/A	N/A
N/A	Nick Rinaldi	N/A	N/A	G	Jr.	N/A	N/A

== Awards and honors ==
Ed Hargaden was named an all-EIC player and an honorable mention All-American, Georgetown's first basketball player to receive an All-America honor of any kind.

== 1933–34 schedule and results ==
It was common practice at this time for colleges and universities to include non-collegiate opponents in their schedules, with the games recognized as part of their official record for the season, and the February 1, 1934, game played against the Brooklyn Knights of Columbus therefore counted as part of Georgetown's won-loss record for 1933–34. It was not until 1952, after the completion of the 1951–52 season, that the National Collegiate Athletic Association (NCAA) ruled that colleges and universities could no longer count games played against non-collegiate opponents in their annual won-loss records.

Date time, TV	Opponent	Result	Record	Site city, state
Regular Season
Tue., Dec. 5, 1933* no, no	Western Maryland	W 32–9	1-0	Tech Gymnasium; Washington, DC
Fri., Dec. 8, 1933 no, no	at Bucknell	W 49–24	2-0 (1-0)	Tustin Gymnasium; Lewisburg, PA
Sat., Dec. 9, 1933 no, no	at Pittsburgh	L 31–34	2-1 (1-1)	Pitt Pavilion; Pittsburgh, PA
Thu., Dec. 14, 1933* no, no	at Princeton	L 22–48	2-2	University Gymnasium; Princeton, NJ
Fri., Jan. 5, 1934* no, no	at Manhattan	L 17–26	2-3	Manhattan Gymnasium; New York, NY
Sat., Jan. 6, 1934* no, no	at New York University	L 23–43	2-4	University Heights Gymnasium; New York, NY
Wed., Jan. 10, 1934* no, no	William & Mary	W 40–29	3-4	Tech Gymnasium; Washington, DC
Thu., Jan. 11, 1934 no, no	at Carnegie Tech	W 24–23	4-4 (2-1)	Skibo Gymnasium; Pittsburgh, PA
Fri., Jan. 12, 1934 no, no	at West Virginia	L 32–37 ^{2OT}	4-5 (2-2)	WVU Field House; Morgantown, WV
Wed., Jan. 17, 1934* no, no	at Navy	L 18–33	4-6	Dahlgren Hall; Annapolis, MD
Sat., Jan. 20, 1934 no, no	Temple	W 30–22	5-6 (3-2)	Tech Gymnasium; Washington, DC
Sat., Jan. 27, 1934* no, no	Mount St. Mary's	W 52–30	6-6	Tech Gymnasium; Washington, DC
Tue., Jan. 30, 1934* no, no	at Yale	L 26–34	6-7	Payne Whitney Gymnasium; New Haven, CT
Wed., Jan. 31, 1934* no, no	at Army	W 27–24	7-7	Hayes Gymnasium; West Point, NY
Thu., Feb. 1, 1934* no, no	at Brooklyn Knights of Columbus	W 26–24	8-7	N/A; New York, NY
Sat., Feb. 3, 1934 no, no	Bucknell	W 63–36	9-7 (4-2)	Tech Gymnasium; Washington, DC
Fri., Feb. 9, 1934* no, no	St. John's	L 39–42	9-8	Tech Gymnasium; Washington, DC
Mon., Feb. 12, 1934 no, no	West Virginia	L 26–31	9-9 (4-3)	Tech Gymnasium; Washington, DC
Sat., Feb. 14, 1934 no, no	at Temple	L 29–34	9-10 (4-4)	Mitten Hall; Philadelphia, PA
Tue., Feb. 20, 1934* no, no	Canisius	W 30–27	10-10	Tech Gymnasium; Washington, DC
Sat., Feb. 24, 1934 no, no	Pittsburgh	L 27–38	10-11 (4-5)	Tech Gymnasium; Washington, DC
Fri., Mar. 2, 1934* no, no	Loyola Maryland	W 53–32	11-11	Tech Gymnasium; Washington, DC
Sat., Mar. 10, 1934 no, no	Carnegie Tech	W 32–28	12-11 (5-5)	Tech Gymnasium; Washington, DC
*Non-conference game. (#) Tournament seedings in parentheses.
