= Jonathan Wallace =

American professional basketball player (born 1986)

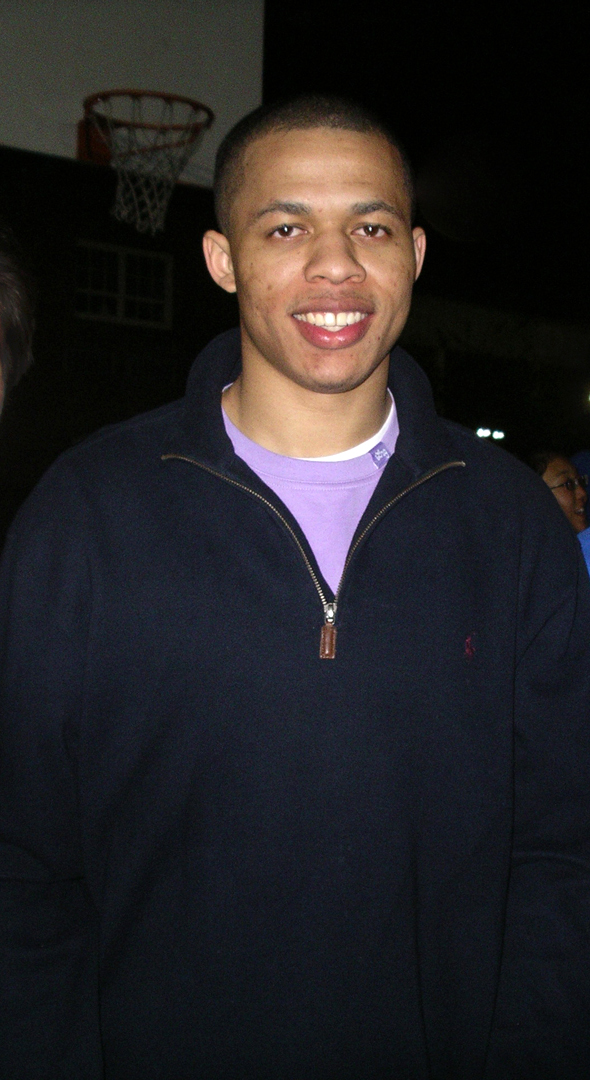
- Jonathan Wallace as a point guard at Georgetown, photographed on March 27, 2007, while visiting with students camped out for 2007 Final Four 2007 .

Personal information
- Born: May 16, 1986 (age 40) Huntsville, Alabama
- Listed height: 6 ft 2 in (1.88 m)
- Listed weight: 190 lb (86 kg)

Career information
- High school: Sparkman (Harvest, Alabama)
- College: Georgetown (2004–2008)
- NBA draft: 2008: undrafted
- Playing career: 2008–2016
- Position: Point guard

Career history

Playing
- 2008: Union Olimpija
- 2009: EWE Oldenburg
- 2009–2010: Rio Grande Valley Vipers
- 2010–2012: Bayern Munich
- 2012–2013: Belfius Mons-Hainaut
- 2013–2015: Walter Tigers Tübingen
- 2015–2016: Recreativo do Libolo

Coaching
- 2016–present: Georgetown University (special assistant)

Career highlights
- German Pro A champion (2011); NBA D-League champion (2010); BBL champion (2009); Second-team All-Big East (2008)

Jonathan Lewis Wallace (born May 16, 1986) is an American professional basketball player who last played for the Walter Tigers Tübingen of the Basketball Bundesliga. The 6'2" guard from Huntsville, Alabama played college basketball for Georgetown University where he was the school's all-time three-point shooting leader in both percentage (43.4 percent) and field goals made (240). He was a government major and was accepted to the Georgetown University Law Center.

== High school career ==
Wallace attended Sparkman High School in Harvest, Alabama, where he averaged 16.5 points, 4.1 assists, 3.1 rebounds and 2.4 steals per game. Wallace also played golf and captained the football team as starting quarterback. In addition, he was second-team All-State, Huntsville All-Metro Team, North Alabama Regional Team, and Wendy's High School Heisman State Finalist. Off the playing field, he was student government president, a National Honor Society member, and a Red Cross volunteer. Wallace also served as a member of Sparkman High School's We the People: The Citizen and the Constitution team in 2004 when it earned fourth place in the national competition.

== Collegiate career ==
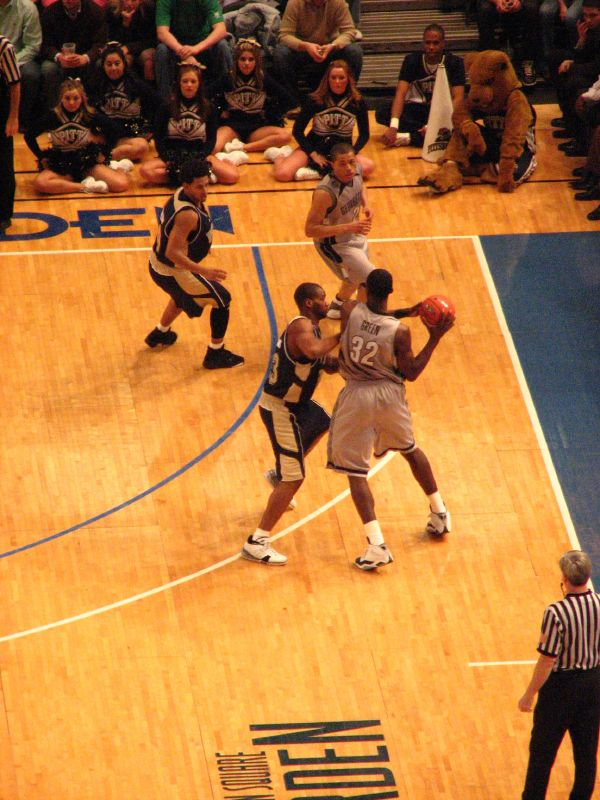
Wallace receives a pass from teammate Jeff Green in the 2007 Big East tournament finals.

Wallace was originally recruited by Georgetown Head Coach John Thompson III when he was still coaching at Princeton University. In his freshman year, he averaged 6.5 points, 2.2 assists, 2.1 rebounds, and 1.2 steals during 30.4 minutes. In his sophomore year, Wallace improved to 8.6 points, 3.2 assists, 2.3 rebounds, and 1.0 steals during 31.1 minutes. In his junior year, Wallace was the starting point guard and led the team, along with highly touted juniors Roy Hibbert and Jeff Green, to the Final Four of the NCAA tournament, before losing to Ohio State. Wallace finished the season averaging 11.4 points, 3.1 assists, 2.7 rebounds, and .8 steals during 32.2 minutes, and shot an exceptional 49% from three-point range. He gained national attention in an Elite Eight matchup with UNC after hitting a three-pointer with 31 seconds left to tie the game. The Hoyas went on to win the game in overtime.

Wallace, whom Roy Hibbert nicknamed "Little Buddy", was on the 2007 pre-season All-Big East first team. As a senior in 2007–08, he averaged 10.7 points and 2.6 assists in 34 games.

== Professional career ==
After going undrafted in the 2008 NBA draft, Wallace joined the Washington Wizards for the 2008 NBA Summer League. He later signed with Union Olimpija of Slovenia′s Premier A Slovenian Basketball League for the 2008–09 season. However, he left the club in November 2008 and signed with EWE Baskets Oldenburg of Germany in February 2009 for the rest of the season.

In November 2009, the Rio Grande Valley Vipers selected Wallace in the second round of the 2009 NBA Developmental League (D-League) draft. In July 2010, he joined the NBA D-League Select Team for the 2010 NBA Summer League.

Wallace later signed with FC Bayern Munich of Germany, where he spent two seasons. On July 28, 2012, he signed with Belfius Mons-Hainaut of Belgium for the 2012–13 season. On July 8, 2013, he signed a one-year deal with the Walter Tigers Tübingen in Germany. On May 23, 2014, he signed a one-year contract extension with Tübingen.

On June 30, 2015, Wallace joined the Charlotte Hornets for the 2015 NBA Summer League. From 2015 to 2016, he played for Recreativo do Libolo of Angola.

In August 2016, Georgetown University announced that it had hired Wallace to return to the school's basketball program as a special assistant to coach John Thompson III.
