= West Englewood, New Jersey =

Populated place in Bergen County, New Jersey, US

- Unincorporated community
- Location of West Englewood in Bergen County Inset: Location of county within the state of New Jersey West Englewood, New Jersey (New Jersey) West Englewood, New Jersey (the United States)
- Coordinates: 40°54′07″N 74°00′11″W
- Country: United States
- State: New Jersey
- County: Bergen
- Township: Teaneck
- Elevation: 98 ft (30 m)
- Time zone: UTC−05:00 (Eastern (EST))
  - Summer (DST): UTC−04:00 (EDT)
- GNIS feature ID: 881700

West Englewood is an unincorporated community located within Teaneck in Bergen County, in the U.S. state of New Jersey.

== Notable people ==
People who were born in, residents of, or otherwise closely associated with West Englewood include:

- Thomas Ryan Byrne (1923–2014), career diplomat who served as United States Ambassador to the Kingdom of Norway.
- Frank Chapman (1864–1945), ornithologist.
