= Patrick Ewing Jr. =

American basketball player (born 1984)

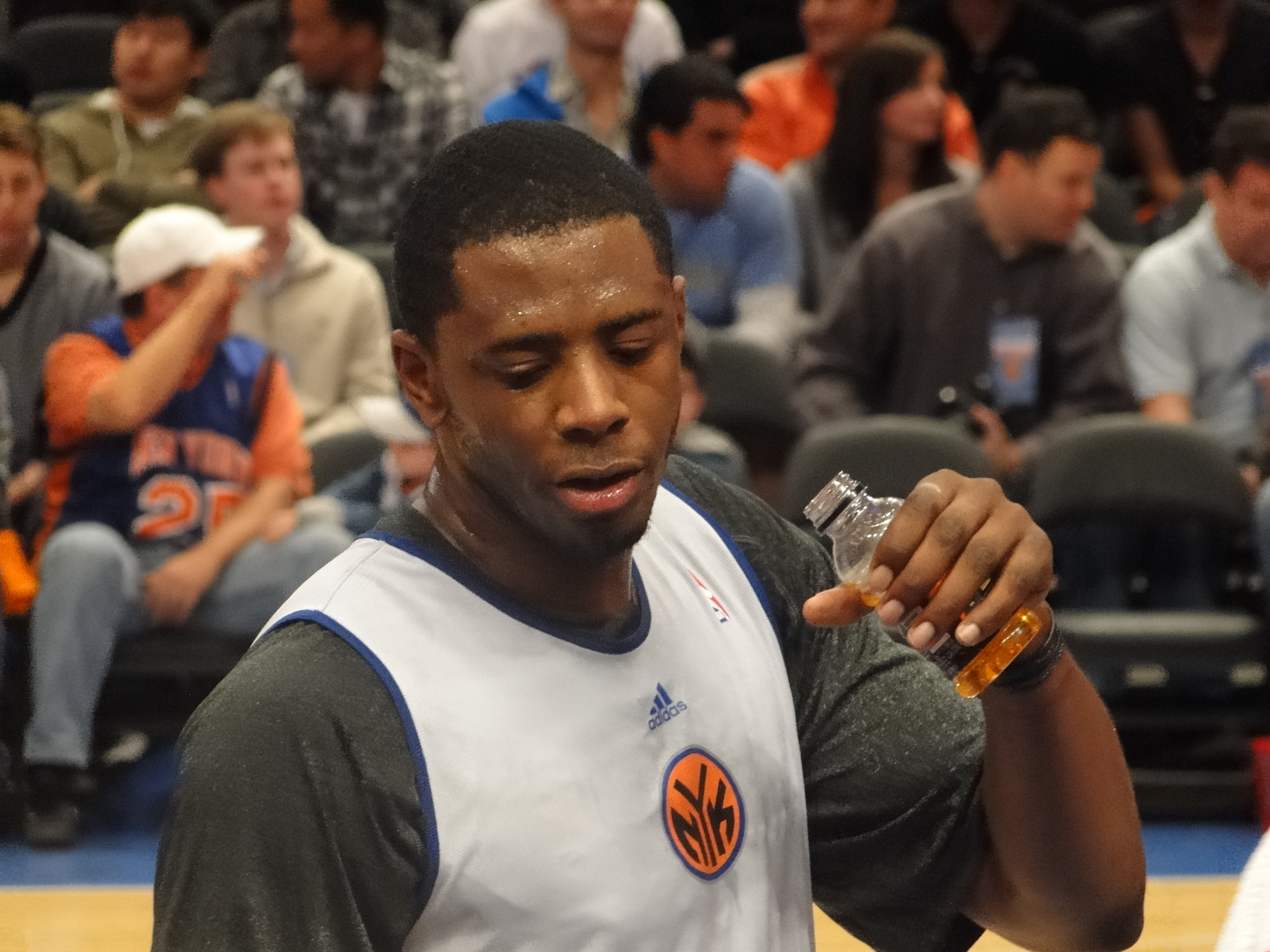
- Ewing at the New York Knicks open practice in 2010

Personal information
- Born: May 20, 1984 (age 42) Boston, Massachusetts, U.S.
- Listed height: 6 ft 8 in (2.03 m)
- Listed weight: 214 lb (97 kg)

Career information
- High school: Marietta (Marietta, Georgia); National Christian Academy (Fort Washington, Maryland)
- College: Indiana (2003–2005); Georgetown (2006–2008)
- NBA draft: 2008: 2nd round, 43rd overall pick
- Drafted by: Sacramento Kings
- Playing career: 2008–2015
- Position: Small forward
- Number: 22
- Coaching career: 2021–present

Career history

Playing
- 2008–2011: Reno Bighorns
- 2011–2012: Sioux Falls Skyforce
- 2011: New Orleans Hornets
- 2012: Iowa Energy
- 2012: Telekom Baskets Bonn
- 2013: CB Valladolid
- 2013–2014: Trikala Aries
- 2014–2015: Nea Kifissia
- 2015: Al Rayyan

Coaching
- 2021: Ottawa Blackjacks (assistant)
- 2022: Newfoundland Growlers
- 2024: South West Metro Pirates (assistant)
- 2025–2026: South West Metro Pirates
- 2025–2026: Brisbane Bullets (assistant)

Career highlights
- NBA Development League All-Star (2011); All-NBA D-League Third Team (2011); Big East Sixth Man of the Year (2008)

Career NBA statistics
- Points: 3 (0.4 ppg)
- Rebounds: 2 (0.3 rpg)
- Assists: 2 (0.3 apg)
- Stats at NBA.com
- Stats at Basketball Reference

Patrick Aloysius Ewing Jr. (born May 20, 1984) is a Jamaican-American professional basketball coach and former player. He is the eldest son of Hall of Fame basketball player and New York Knicks legend Patrick Ewing.

== Early life ==
Ewing first attended The Windward School in White Plains, New York before going to The Elisabeth Morrow School in Englewood, New Jersey. He then went to Holy Innocents' Episcopal School and Marietta High School in Georgia, and National Christian Academy in Fort Washington, Maryland.

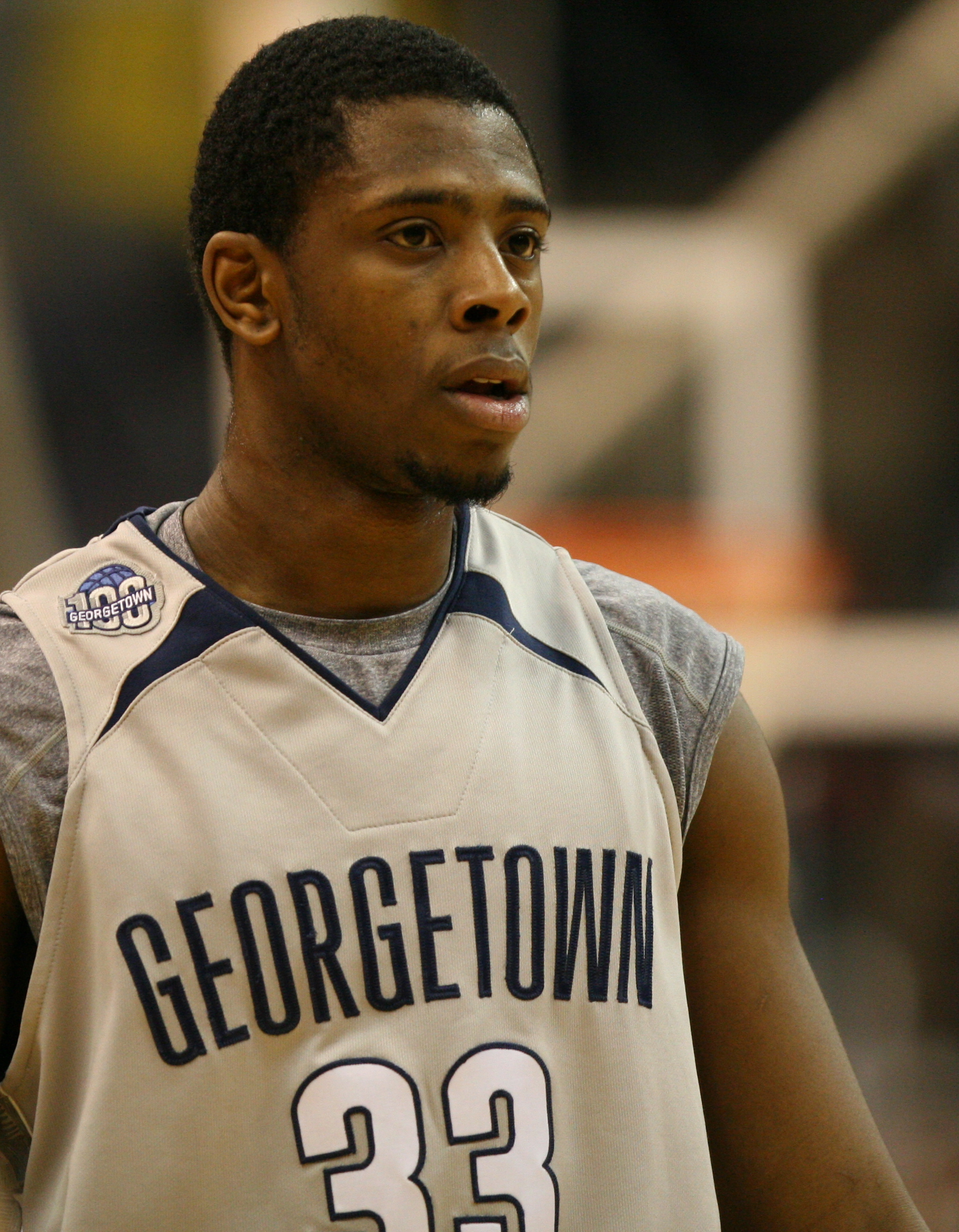
Ewing wore no. 33 at Georgetown like his father

He signed with Indiana University on May 1, 2003, and played two seasons at Indiana before following his father's footsteps by transferring to Georgetown University in 2005. Under the NCAA transfer rules, Ewing had to sit out the 2005–06 season. He returned in 2006–07 season, playing 36 games for the Hoyas. In the 2007–08 season, he participated in the College Slam Dunk Contest at St. Mary's University in San Antonio during the Final Four weekend. As a senior with the Hoyas, Ewing averaged 6.1 points, 4.2 rebounds and 1.8 assists in 34 games, winning the Big East Conference Sixth Man of the Year award. Ewing cited the Hoyas offense as the reason why his offensive numbers were low in comparison to what he would go on to average in the NBA D-League.

In college, Ewing wore the same jersey number (no. 33) as his father. However, Alonzo Mourning was last to use this number for Georgetown, so Ewing reportedly had to get Mourning's permission before using it.

Ewing's coach at Georgetown, John Thompson III, was the son of John Thompson Jr., who coached the elder Ewing at Georgetown.

== Professional career ==
Ewing was chosen as the 43rd overall pick in the 2008 NBA draft by the Sacramento Kings. Soon afterwards, he signed a contract with the Kings. He was later traded to the Houston Rockets in a five-player deal that brought Ron Artest to the Rockets. On August 29, 2008, Ewing followed his father's footsteps once again when he was traded to the New York Knicks in exchange for the rights of former first round pick Frédéric Weis.

After some initial speculation that he would wear his father's retired number 33, Ewing took number 6 in honor of his favorite player, Bill Russell, which was also his father's number in his final season in the NBA with the Orlando Magic and on the 1992 Olympic national team.

Ewing played in two Knicks preseason games prior to making his New York debut in the Knicks' final pre-season game on October 24, 2008. Ewing entered the game in the fourth quarter to a thunderous ovation by the Madison Square Garden crowd. Ewing helped fuel the Knicks' late rally, where the Knicks would come back from a 21-point deficit. Ewing had two dunks, a three-pointer, a steal and a blocked shot. He had seven fourth quarter points. In total, he played three pre-season games for the Knicks, averaging 8.1 minutes, 3.7 points and 1.7 rebounds. On October 27, 2008, Ewing was waived by the Knicks in order to get the roster down to the maximum of 15 players for the start of the 2008–09 season.

Ewing was signed by Knicks' D-League affiliate, the Reno Bighorns, on December 15, 2008. On the day he signed, Ewing made his D-League debut against Utah Flash, recording 15 points. After his first 30 games with the Bighorns, Ewing averaged 16.8 points, 8.9 rebounds, 3.1 assists, 1.5 steals and 1.3 blocks per game with an efficiency rating of +20.00. On March 16, 2009, the Reno Bighorns waived Ewing after he reportedly suffered a Grade 1 MCL (medial collateral ligament) sprain.

Ewing was named to the New York Knicks roster for the 2009 NBA Summer League in Las Vegas, but was unable to participate due to injury.

Ewing played for the Orlando Magic in the 2010 NBA Summer League in Orlando, as well as for the Knicks in Las Vegas. On August 27, 2010, Ewing signed with the Knicks. However, he was once again waived at the end of training camp. He was then re-acquired by the Reno Bighorns of the NBA D-League. On January 25, 2011, he was traded to the Sioux Falls Skyforce for Danny Green. On March 26, the New Orleans Hornets signed Ewing to a 10-day contract following the injury of David West. On April 5, he was signed for the remainder of the season.

On December 13, 2011, he was waived by the Hornets.

In January 2012, Ewing returned to the Sioux Falls Skyforce. On February 9, Ewing was acquired by the Iowa Energy in a trade for Marqus Blakely.

On July 4, 2012, Ewing signed a one-year contract with the Telekom Baskets Bonn of the German Bundesliga. He was released from his contract in December 2012. On January 9, 2013, Ewing signed with Blancos de Rueda Valladolid of the Spanish Liga ACB. On March 19, he parted ways with the Valladolid.

In July 2013, Ewing joined the Charlotte Bobcats for the 2013 NBA Summer League. On September 28, 2013, he signed with the Greek League club Trikala Aries for the 2013–14 season.

In September 2014, he signed with Nea Kifissia of Greece. On January 5, 2015, he parted ways with Nea Kifisia. Later in 2015, he joined Al Rayyan of the Qatari Basketball League.

== Coaching career ==
In February 2021, Ewing was named lead assistant coach of the Ottawa Blackjacks of the Canadian Elite Basketball League (CEBL). On February 18, 2022, Ewing was named the inaugural head coach and general manager for the expansion Newfoundland Growlers of the CEBL. He returned to the Blackjacks as senior director of player personnel for the 2023 CEBL season.

Ewing joined the South West Metro Pirates of NBL1 North as an assistant coach for the 2024 season. Following the NBL1 season, he joined the Brisbane Bullets as player development coach for the 2024–25 NBL season.

On 1 October 2024, Ewing was appointed head coach of the South West Metro Pirates for the 2025 and 2026 seasons.

== National team career ==
Although he is American-born, Ewing represented the Jamaican national team in international competition. His father, Patrick Ewing, was born in Jamaica.

== Career statistics ==
Legend
GP	Games played	GS	Games started	MPG	Minutes per game
FG%	Field goal percentage	3P%	3-point field goal percentage	FT%	Free throw percentage
RPG	Rebounds per game	APG	Assists per game	SPG	Steals per game
BPG	Blocks per game	PPG	Points per game	**Bold**	Career high

=== NBA ===
==== Regular season ====
Year	Team	GP	GS	MPG	FG%	3P%	FT%	RPG	APG	SPG	BPG	PPG
2010–11	New Orleans	7	0	2.7	.000	.000	.750	.3	.3	.0	.1	.4

==== Playoffs ====
Year	Team	GP	GS	MPG	FG%	3P%	FT%	RPG	APG	SPG	BPG	PPG
2011	New Orleans	2	0	1.0	1.000	1.000	–	.0	.0	.0	.0	1.5

== See also ==
- List of second-generation NBA players
