= UMass Minutemen basketball statistical leaders =

The UMass Minutemen basketball statistical leaders are individual statistical leaders of the UMass Minutemen basketball program in various categories, including points, assists, blocks, rebounds, and steals. Within those areas, the lists identify single-game, single-season, and career leaders.

As of the 2025–26 NCAA Division I season, the Minutemen represent the University of Massachusetts Amherst in the Mid-American Conference. UMass had been a member of the Atlantic 10 Conference from that body's 1976 creation as the Eastern Collegiate Basketball League through the 2024–25 season.

UMass began competing in intercollegiate basketball in 1899. However, the school's record book does not generally list records from before the 1950s, as records from before this period are often incomplete and inconsistent. Since scoring was much lower in this era, and teams played much fewer games during a typical season, it is likely that few or no players from this era would appear on these lists anyway.

The NCAA did not officially record assists as a stat until the 1983–84 season, and blocks and steals until the 1985–86 season, but UMass's record books includes players in these stats before these seasons. These lists are updated through the end of the 2020–21 season.

== Scoring ==
Career
Rk	Player	Points	Seasons
1	Jim McCoy	2374	1988–89 1989–90 1990–91 1991–92
2	Monty Mack	2183	1997–98 1998–99 1999–00 2000–01
3	Ricky Harris	1960	2006–07 2007–08 2008–09 2009–10
4	Lou Roe	1905	1991–92 1992–93 1993–94 1994–95
5	Rashaun Freeman	1744	2003–04 2004–05 2005–06 2006–07
6	Lorenzo Sutton	1731	1984–85 1985–86 1986–87 1987–88
7	Chaz Williams	1653	2011–12 2012–13 2013–14
8	Tony Barbee	1643	1989–90 1990–91 1991–92 1992–93
9	Donald Russell	1558	1981–82 1982–83 1983–84 1984–85
10	Harper Williams	1534	1989–90 1990–91 1991–92 1992–93

Season
Rk	Player	Points	Season
1	Julius Erving	727	1970–71
2	Gary Forbes	698	2007–08
3	Luwane Pipkins	678	2017–18
4	Marcus Camby	675	1995–96
5	Ricky Harris	656	2007–08
6	Lou Roe	650	1993–94
7	Julius Erving	643	1969–70
8	Jim McCoy	640	1989–90
9	Monty Mack	632	1999–00
10	Chaz Williams	627	2011–12

Single game
Rk	Player	Points	Season	Opponent
1	Rahsool Diggins	46	2024–25	Fordham
2	Luwane Pipkins	44	2017–18	La Salle
3	Billy Tindall	41	1967–68	Vermont
4	Trey Davis	40	2015–16	New Orleans
5	Billy Prevey	39	1951–52	Rhode Island
	Lorenzo Sutton	39	1987–88	Rutgers
7	Luwane Pipkins	38	2017–18	VCU
	Marcus Camby	38	1995–96	Dayton
9	Marcus Banks Jr.	37	2025–26	Central Michigan
	Tre Mitchell	37	2020–21	La Salle
	Zach Lewis	37	2016–17	La Salle
	Jabarie Hinds	37	2015–16	Duquesne
	Bill Stephens	37	1952–53	Springfield
	Clarence Hill	37	1965–66	Rutgers
	Billy Tindall	37	1966–67	DePaul
	Julius Erving	37	1969–70	Fordham
	Julius Erving	37	1969–70	New Hampshire
	John Hempel	37	1982–83	West Virginia

== Rebounds ==
Career
Rk	Player	Rebounds	Seasons
1	Lou Roe	1070	1991–92 1992–93 1993–94 1994–95
2	Julius Erving	1049	1969–70 1970–71
3	Rashaun Freeman	998	2003–04 2004–05 2005–06 2006–07
4	Horace Neysmith	935	1981–82 1982–83 1983–84 1984–85
5	Tim Edwards	903	1963–64 1964–65 1966–67
6	Cady Lalanne	881	2011–12 2012–13 2013–14 2014–15
7	Jim Town	879	1974–75 1975–76 1976–77
8	Tyrone Weeks	858	1994–95 1995–96 1996–97 1997–98
9	Harper Williams	854	1989–90 1990–91 1991–92 1992–93
10	Billy Tindall	837	1965–66 1966–67 1967–68

Season
Rk	Player	Rebounds	Season
1	Julius Erving	527	1970–71
2	Julius Erving	522	1969–70
3	Jim Town	351	1976–77
4	Tim Edwards	342	1966–67
5	Jim Town	334	1975–76
6	Tim Edwards	330	1964–65
7	Rashaun Freeman	315	2006–07
8	Charlie O'Rourke	308	1963–64
9	Tony Gaffney	307	2008–09
10	Charlie O'Rourke	304	1964–65

Single game
Rk	Player	Rebounds	Season	Opponent
1	Julius Erving	32	1970–71	Syracuse
2	Julius Erving	30	1970–71	St. Michael's
3	Julius Erving	28	1969–70	Maine
	Julius Erving	28	1969–70	Providence
5	Jim Town	27	1976–77	Boston College
	Julius Erving	27	1969–70	Northeastern
	Julius Erving	27	1969–70	Boston University
	Connie McDonough	27	1954–55	A.I.C.

== Assists ==
Career
Rk	Player	Assists	Seasons
1	Chaz Williams	702	2011–12 2012–13 2013–14
2	Chris Lowe	678	2005–06 2006–07 2007–08 2008–09
3	Carl Smith	633	1983–84 1984–85 1985–86 1986–87
4	Edgar Padilla	597	1993–94 1994–95 1995–96 1996–97
5	Alex Eldridge	518	1974–75 1975–76 1976–77 1977–78
6	Derek Kellogg	453	1991–92 1992–93 1993–94 1994–95
7	Joe DiSarcina	431	1966–67 1967–68 1968–69
8	Anton Brown	417	1988–89 1989–90 1990–91 1991–92
9	Anthony Anderson	367	2001–02 2002–03 2003–04 2004–05
10	Charlton Clarke	350	1995–96 1996–97 1997–98 1998–99

Season
Rk	Player	Assists	Season
1	Edgar Padilla	247	1995–96
2	Chaz Williams	242	2012–13
3	Cary Herer	238	1989–90
4	Chaz Williams	231	2011–12
5	Chaz Williams	229	2013–14
6	Chris Lowe	214	2007–08
7	Carl Smith	212	1983–84
8	Danny Carbuccia	207	2025–26
9	Chris Lowe	193	2008–09
10	Carl Smith	191	1985–86

Single game
Rk	Player	Assists	Season	Opponent
1	Danny Carbuccia	17	2025–26	Central Michigan
2	Chaz Williams	15	2013–14	BYU
	Carl Smith	15	1985–86	Duquesne
	Alex Eldridge	15	1977–78	Connecticut
	Joe DiSarcina	15	1968–69	Maine
6	Chris Lowe	14	2007–08	La Salle
	Dick Conlin	14	1961–62	Northeastern
8	Danny Carbuccia	13	2025–26	Harvard
	Chaz Williams	13	2012–13	Temple
	Chris Lowe	13	2007–08	Saint Louis
	Carl Smith	13	1983–84	Duquesne
	Carl Smith	13	1983–84	Rutgers
	Alex Eldridge	13	1977–78	Holy Cross
	Alex Eldridge	13	1977–78	Bentley
	Clarence Hill	13	1965–66	New Hampshire

== Steals ==
Career
Rk	Player	Steals	Seasons
1	Edgar Padilla	249	1993–94 1994–95 1995–96 1996–97
2	Chaz Williams	199	2011–12 2012–13 2013–14
3	Monty Mack	154	1997–98 1998–99 1999–00 2000–01
4	Anthony Anderson	150	2001–02 2002–03 2003–04 2004–05
5	Ricky Harris	148	2006–07 2007–08 2008–09 2009–10
6	Mike Williams	145	1991–92 1992–93 1993–94 1994–95
7	Luwane Pipkins	142	2016–17 2017–18 2018–19
	Shannon Crooks	142	1999–00 2000–01 2001–02
	Donald Russell	142	1981–82 1982–83 1983–84 1984–85
10	Jim McCoy	141	1988–89 1989–90 1990–91 1991–92

Season
Rk	Player	Steals	Season
1	Edgar Padilla	108	1995–96
2	Chaz Williams	81	2011–12
3	Cary Herer	74	1989–90
4	Chaz Williams	66	2012–13
5	Edgar Padilla	65	1996–97
6	Luwane Pipkins	63	2016–17
7	Monty Mack	62	1999–00
8	Tony Gaffney	61	2008–09
9	Chris Kirkland	60	1999–00
10	Shannon Crooks	58	1999–00

Single game
Rk	Player	Steals	Season	Opponent
1	Matt Cross	8	2023–24	Siena
	Luwane Pipkins	8	2016–17	UMass Lowell
	Alex Eldridge	8	1977–78	Maine
	Alex Eldridge	8	1977–78	Harvard
5	Noah Fernandes	7	2021–22	George Washington
	Luwane Pipkins	7	2016–17	UCF
	Edgar Padilla	7	1995–96	UCF
	Edgar Padilla	7	1995–96	Duquesne
9	Raphiael Putney	6	2011–12	Rhode Island
	Tony Gaffney	6	2007–08	Northern Illinois
	Maurice Maxwell	6	2004–05	Florida State
	Shannon Crooks	6	2000–01	Iona
	Chris Kirkland	6	1999–00	Fordham
	Charlton Clarke	6	1997–98	Virginia Tech
	Tyrone Weeks	6	1997–98	Cincinnati
	Edgar Padilla	6	1995–96	Saint Joseph's
	Edgar Padilla	6	1994–95	Stanford
	Cary Herer	6	1989–90	Penn State
	Lorenzo Sutton	6	1986–87	Keene State
	Matt Ryan	6	1984–85	Rutgers

== Blocks ==
Career
Rk	Player	Blocks	Seasons
1	Stephane Lasme	399	2003–04 2004–05 2005–06 2006–07
2	Marcus Camby	336	1993–94 1994–95 1995–96
3	Harper Williams	222	1989–90 1990–91 1991–92 1992–93
4	Lari Ketner	204	1996–97 1997–98 1998–99
5	Cady Lalanne	197	2011–12 2012–13 2013–14 2014–15
6	Edwin Green	190	1980–81 1981–82 1982–83 1983–84
7	Kitwana Rhymer	184	1998–99 1999–00 2000–01 2001–02
8	Tony Gaffney	174	2007–08 2008–09
9	Will Herndon	128	1989–90 1990–91 1991–92
10	Lou Roe	121	1991–92 1992–93 1993–94 1994–95

Season
Rk	Player	Blocks	Season
1	Stephane Lasme	168	2006–07
2	Marcus Camby	128	1995–96
3	Tony Gaffney	115	2008–09
4	Stephane Lasme	108	2005–06
5	Marcus Camby	105	1993–94
6	Marcus Camby	103	1994–95
7	Harper Williams	74	1990–91
8	Lari Ketner	73	1996–97
9	Stephane Lasme	72	2004–05
10	Cady Lalanne	71	2013–14

Single game
Rk	Player	Blocks	Season	Opponent
1	Stephane Lasme	11	2006–07	Rhode Island
	Stephane Lasme	11	2006–07	George Washington
	Stephane Lasme	11	2006–07	St. Francis (N.Y.)
4	Stephane Lasme	10	2006–07	La Salle
5	Tony Gaffney	9	2008–09	Boston College
	Stephane Lasme	9	2006–07	Alabama
	Stephane Lasme	9	2006–07	La Salle
	Stephane Lasme	9	2005–06	Davidson
	Marcus Camby	9	1995–96	Temple
	Marcus Camby	9	1995–96	St. Bonaventure
	Harper Williams	9	1990–91	Rhode Island
