= Travis Ford =

American basketball coach (born 1969)

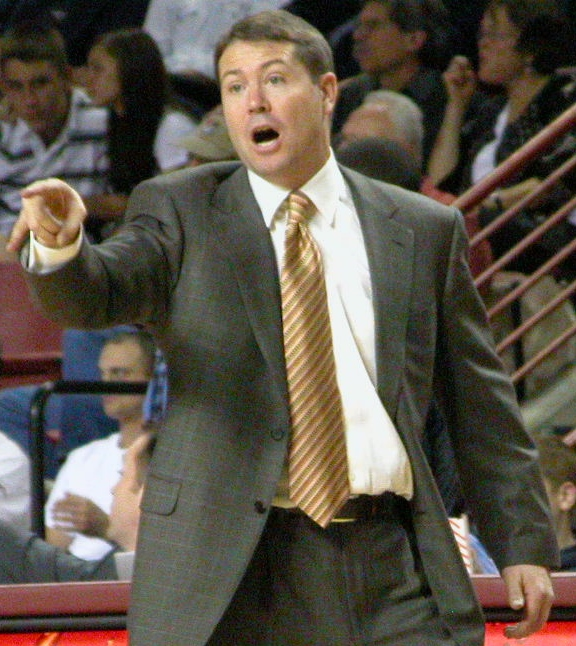
- Ford in 2006

Current position
- Title: Head coach
- Team: Little Rock
- Conference: UAC
- Record: 0–0 (–)

Biographical details
- Born: December 29, 1969 (age 56); Madisonville, Kentucky, U.S.

Playing career
- 1989–1990: Missouri
- 1991–1994: Kentucky
- Position: Point guard

Coaching career (HC unless noted)
- 1997–2000: Campbellsville
- 2000–2005: Eastern Kentucky
- 2005–2008: UMass
- 2008–2016: Oklahoma State
- 2016–2024: Saint Louis
- 2026–present: Little Rock

Head coaching record
- Overall: 491–366 (.573)
- Tournaments: 1–7 (NCAA Division I); 0–1 (NAIA Division I); 6–5 (NIT)

Accomplishments and honors

Championships
- OVC tournament (2005); A-10 regular season (2007); A-10 tournament (2019)
Medal record
Men's basketball
Representing United States
Summer Universiade
Gold medal – first place	1993 Buffalo	National team

Travis Ford (born December 29, 1969) is an American college basketball coach. He is the head coach at Little Rock. He previously was the Head Coach at Saint Louis University, Oklahoma State, Massachusetts, Eastern Kentucky and Campbellsville University. Prior to that, he played at the University of Missouri and the University of Kentucky.

== Early life ==
Travis Ford was born in Madisonville, Kentucky on December 29, 1969.

== Playing career ==
While attending Madisonville North Hopkins High School, Ford made three state tournament appearances and was Western Kentucky Player of the Year twice. He was named to the All-State Team, and earned 31.7 points as a senior.

Ford entered the University of Missouri in 1989. He played basketball for the Missouri Tigers and was named to the Big Eight Conference All-Freshman team. The following year, Ford transferred to the University of Kentucky to play for head coach Rick Pitino, sitting out the 1990–91 season due to NCAA rules on transfers. After playing sparingly his sophomore year, Ford was a starter during his junior and senior years, and set school records in single-game assists (15), single-season three-point field goals (101) and consecutive free throws made (50). Ford was named to the All-SEC team his junior and senior years, and was recognized as the Southeast Region's Most Outstanding Player in the 1993 NCAA tournament. During his three eligible seasons with Kentucky, the Wildcats won three consecutive SEC Tournament championships (1992–94), won an SEC East Division title in 1992, and made it to the 1993 Final Four.

He earned a bachelor's degree in communications from University of Kentucky in 1994.

After an unsuccessful attempt at an NBA career, Ford landed the role of Danny O'Grady in the 1997 movie The 6th Man, starring Marlon Wayans and Kadeem Hardison.

== Coaching career ==
=== Campbellsville ===
In 1997, Ford was offered the head coach job at Campbellsville University. He accepted the position, and in 1999 led the Tigers to a 28–3 record, earning Mid-South Conference Coach of the Year honors.

=== Eastern Kentucky ===
In 2000, Ford accepted the head coaching position at Eastern Kentucky University in Richmond, Kentucky. In five seasons at EKU, Ford led the Colonels from a 7–19 record his first year to a 22–9 record and an Ohio Valley Conference championship in 2005. In a much publicized first-round NCAA Tournament matchup with his alma mater, the University of Kentucky, Ford's team pushed the Wildcats to the limit before losing 72–64.

=== UMass ===
After the 2004–05 season, Ford accepted the head coaching position at the University of Massachusetts Amherst. During his first season, 2005–06, with the Minutemen, Ford posted a 13–15 record, 8–8 in the Atlantic 10 Conference. The 2006–07 season saw Ford coach UMass to the fifth most wins in school history with an overall mark of 24–9. The team shared the Atlantic 10 Conference regular season title with Xavier, going 13–3, but lost to Saint Louis in the second round of the Atlantic 10 tournament. After earning a #4 seed in the postseason National Invitation Tournament, UMass defeated Alabama before losing in the second round to eventual NIT champion West Virginia. The team featured Atlantic 10 Player of the Year Stéphane Lasme. After the season ended, Ford's name was circulated as a long-shot replacement for the head coaching position at Ford's alma mater, the University of Kentucky. It was also reported that Ford turned down an offer from Providence College. After the season on April 10, 2007, UMass announced that Ford had signed a five-year contract extension.

The 2007–08 season was arguably even more successful for Ford and Massachusetts. The team finished the season with a 25–11 record and a 10–6 record in the Atlantic 10 Conference. After losing in the A-10 tournament to Charlotte, UMass accepted an invitation to the NIT for the second straight year. They defeated Stephen F. Austin, Akron, Syracuse and Florida to make it to the NIT Finals. In the NIT Finals, they lost to Ohio State 92–85. Ohio State had made the previous year's NCAA championship game. Despite the team's postseason success and the previous year's contract extension, Ford would leave the next season for Oklahoma State.

=== Oklahoma State ===
On April 16, 2008, Oklahoma State hired Ford to become the head basketball coach. In his first season, Ford led the Cowboys to a 23–12 overall record, with a 9–7 record in conference. He led Oklahoma State to its first NCAA tournament appearance since the 2004–05 season. In the tournament, Oklahoma State beat Tennessee before being knocked off by Pittsburgh in the second round. In year two, Ford's Cowboys finished 22–11, 9–7 in conference. The year was highlighted by wins over a top ten Kansas State on the road and a home win over #1 ranked Kansas. Big 12 player of the year James Anderson was instrumental in both wins and became Travis Ford's first Cowboy to be selected in the first round of the NBA draft.

Prior to the 2010–11 season, Ford signed McDonald's All-American recruit Marcus Smart. The Cowboys finished 24–9 overall, 13–5 in conference. Ford's fifth season was highlighted by a huge win in Lawrence, Kansas against Kansas – the first win by OSU at Kansas since 1989. Marcus Smart was named the Wayman Tisdale National Freshman of the Year and Big 12 Player of the Year. Oklahoma State earned a 5 seed in the NCAA tournament but failed to advance after a disappointing loss to #12 seed Oregon. Travis Ford had three key players announce their return for the 2013–14 season in Marcus Smart, Lebryan Nash, and Markel Brown. A promising non-conference start was followed by a stumbling conference slate and the team finished 21–13, 8–10 in Big 12 play. A loss to Gonzaga in the Second Round (formerly known as the First Round) of the NCAA tournament followed. Another difficult season followed as the Cowboys finished the season 18–14, 8–10 in Big 12 play with a disappointing Second Round loss to Oregon in the NCAA tournament. The 2015–16 season was even worse, OSU finished the season 12–20, 3–15 in Big 12 play.

On March 18, 2016, it was announced that Ford and the Cowboys agreed to part ways after 8 years as head coach.

=== Saint Louis ===
On March 30, 2016, Saint Louis University announced that Ford has been hired as the head basketball coach. He inherited a Billikens team that had gone a disappointing 11–21 each of the previous two seasons under head coach Jim Crews. Due to a lack of talent from the previous regime, SLU was predicted to finish dead last of the Atlantic 10 conference during the 2016–17 season. Basketball statistician Ken Pomeroy predicted the Billikens as the team most likely to go winless throughout its conference schedule. Ford led the Billikens to six Atlantic 10 conference wins and a 146–109 overall record while at Saint Louis. Ford was fired by Saint Louis University in 2024.

=== Sports analyst ===
Ford made his debut as a sports analyst in November 2024, commentating on the University of Kentucky-Lipscomb game.

=== Little Rock ===
On March 26, 2026, Ford was introduced as the new head coach for the University of Arkansas at Little Rock (UALR) Trojans, replacing former coach Darrell Walker.

== Personal life ==
Ford has three children, Brooks, Kyleigh, and Shane, with his wife Heather.

== Head coaching record ==
Record table
Season	Team	Overall	Conference	Standing	Postseason
Campbellsville Tigers (Mid-South Conference) (1997–2000)
1997–98	Campbellsville	7–26*			
1998–99	Campbellsville	28–3	10–2		Ineligible
1999–00	Campbellsville	23–11	8–4	T–2nd	NAIA Division I first round
Campbellsville:		67–31 (.684)	25–11 (.694)		
Eastern Kentucky Colonels (Ohio Valley Conference) (2000–2005)
2000–01	Eastern Kentucky	7–19	1–15	9th	
2001–02	Eastern Kentucky	7–20	3–13	9th	
2002–03	Eastern Kentucky	11–17	5–11	T–8th	
2003–04	Eastern Kentucky	14–15	8–8	4th	
2004–05	Eastern Kentucky	22–9	11–5	2nd	NCAA Division I Round of 64
Eastern Kentucky:		61–80 (.433)	28–52 (.350)		
UMass Minutemen (Atlantic 10 Conference) (2005–2008)
2005–06	UMass	13–15	8–8	T–7th	
2006–07	UMass	24–9	13–3	T–1st	NIT second round
2007–08	UMass	25–11	10–6	3rd	NIT Runner-up
UMass:		62–35 (.639)	31–17 (.646)		
Oklahoma State Cowboys (Big 12 Conference) (2008–2016)
2008–09	Oklahoma State	23–12	9–7	T–4th	NCAA Division I Round of 32
2009–10	Oklahoma State	22–11	9–7	T–6th	NCAA Division I Round of 64
2010–11	Oklahoma State	20–14	6–10	9th	NIT second round
2011–12	Oklahoma State	15–18	7–11	7th	
2012–13	Oklahoma State	24–9	13–5	3rd	NCAA Division I Round of 64
2013–14	Oklahoma State	21–13	8–10	8th	NCAA Division I Round of 64
2014–15	Oklahoma State	18–14	8–10	T–6th	NCAA Division I Round of 64
2015–16	Oklahoma State	12–20	3–15	9th	
Oklahoma State:		155–111 (.583)	63–75 (.457)		
Saint Louis Billikens (Atlantic 10 Conference) (2016–2024)
2016–17	Saint Louis	12–21	6–12	11th	
2017–18	Saint Louis	17–16	9–9	T–5th	
2018–19	Saint Louis	23–13	10–8	T–6th	NCAA Division I Round of 64
2019–20	Saint Louis	23–8	12–6	4th	Postseason cancelled because of COVID-19
2020–21	Saint Louis	14–7	6–4	T–4th	NIT first round
2021–22	Saint Louis	23–12	12–6	5th	NIT first round
2022–23	Saint Louis	21–12	12–6	T–2nd	
2023–24	Saint Louis	13–20	5–13	T–13th	
Saint Louis:		146–109 (.573)	72–64 (.529)		
Little Rock Trojans (United Athletic Conference) (2026–present)
2026–27	Little Rock	0–0	0–0		
Little Rock:		0–0 (–)	0–0 (–)		
Total:		491–366 (.573)			
National champion Postseason invitational champion Conference regular season champion Conference regular season and conference tournament champion Division regular season champion Division regular season and conference tournament champion Conference tournament champion

* Campbellsville forfeited 9 games in the season due to an ineligible player.
