= 2006–07 Wichita State Shockers men's basketball team =

American college basketball season

2006–07 Wichita State Shockers men's basketball
- Conference: Missouri Valley Conference
- Record: 17–14 (8–10 MVC)
- Head coach: Mark Turgeon (7th season)
- Assistant coach: Scott Spinelli (1st season)
- Home arena: Charles Koch Arena

2006–07 Missouri Valley Conference men's basketball standings
	Conf.				Overall
Team	W		L	PCT	W		L	PCT
No. 14 Southern Illinois	15	–	3	.833	29	–	7	.806
Creighton †	13	–	5	.722	22	–	11	.667
Missouri State	12	–	6	.667	22	–	11	.667
Bradley	10	–	8	.556	22	–	13	.629
Northern Iowa	9	–	9	.500	18	–	13	.581
Wichita State	8	–	10	.444	17	–	14	.548
Illinois State	6	–	12	.333	15	–	16	.484
Evansville	6	–	12	.333	14	–	17	.452
Drake	6	–	12	.333	17	–	15	.531
Indiana State	5	–	13	.278	13	–	18	.419
† 2007 MVC tournament winner Rankings from AP poll

The 2006–07 Wichita State Shockers men's basketball team represented Wichita State University in the 2006–07 NCAA Division I men's basketball season. The team plays in the Missouri Valley Conference (MVC) and was led by head coach Mark Turgeon in his seventh and final year.

== Missouri Valley Conference standings ==
#	Team	Conference	Pct.	Overall	Pct.
1	Southern Illinois	15–3	.833	29-7	.806
2	Creighton	13–5	.722	22-11	.667
3	Missouri State	12-6	.667	22-11	.667
4	Bradley	10–8	.556	22-13	.629
5	Northern Iowa	9–9	.500	18-13	.581
6	Wichita State	8-10	.444	17–14	.548
7	Drake	6-12	.333	17–15	.531
8	Illinois State	6-12	.333	15–16	.484
9	Evansville	6-12	.333	14-17	.452
10	Indiana State	5-13	.278	13-18	.419
