= Karl Hobbs =

American men's college basketball coach (born 1961)

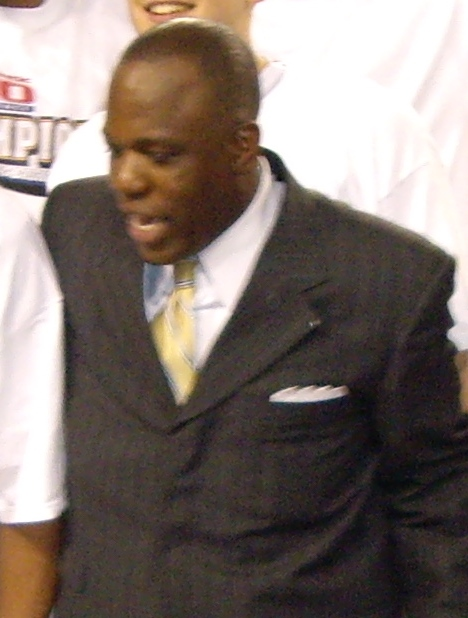
- Hobbs after the 2007 Atlantic 10 tournament

Current position
- Title: Associate Head Coach
- Team: Georgia Tech
- Conference: ACC

Biographical details
- Born: August 7, 1961 (age 65); Roxbury, Massachusetts, U.S.

Playing career
- 1981–1984: UConn
- Position: Point guard

Coaching career (HC unless noted)
- 1987–1993: Boston University (assistant)
- 1993–2001: UConn (assistant)
- 2001–2011: George Washington
- 2012–2016: UConn (assistant)
- 2016–2023: Rutgers (associate HC)
- 2023–present: Georgia Tech (associate HC)

Head coaching record
- Overall: 166–129
- Tournaments: 1–3 (NCAA Division I); 0–1 (NIT); 0–1 (CBI)

Accomplishments and honors

Championships
- 2 A-10 tournament (2005, 2007); A-10 regular season (2006)

Awards
- A-10 Coach of the Year (2006)

Karl Bernard Hobbs II (born August 7, 1961) is an American men's college basketball coach, currently the associate head coach at Georgia Tech. He is the former head coach of the George Washington University Colonials men's basketball team. During his tenure, the Colonials won two Atlantic 10 Conference championships and made three consecutive NCAA Tournament appearances from 2005–07. Hobbs is known for his high-energy, frenetic coaching style.

== Early years ==
Karl Hobbs was born and raised in Roxbury, Massachusetts, a neighborhood of Boston. Hobbs began his high school basketball career at Burke High School before he transferred to Cambridge Rindge and Latin School in a highly controversial decision in which Burke coach Joe Day accused Cambridge coach Mike Jarvis of illegally recruiting Hobbs. At Cambridge, Hobbs played point guard alongside future NBA star Patrick Ewing. They won the Massachusetts State High School title and Hobbs was named Massachusetts Schoolboy Player of the Year for the 1979–80 season. After high school, the 5'8" Hobbs attended the University of Connecticut playing basketball for coach Dom Perno and setting a school record (since-broken) with 534 career assists – a total that currently ranks fourth in school history. Hobbs played for the Rhode Island Gulls of the USBL in July 1985 before returning to Connecticut and finishing his Bachelor of Science degree in family studies in the summer of 1986.

== Coaching career ==
=== Early positions ===
Hobbs joined Jarvis's staff as an assistant coach at Boston University in 1988 and remained there as an assistant through 1993. Then, he joined Jim Calhoun as an assistant at UConn where he stayed from 1993–2001. During this time, he worked at both schools in the training and development of their guards and honed his recruiting skills. When Dave Leitao left Calhoun's staff to become the head coach at Northeastern University, Hobbs was elevated to his position as the top recruiter. Hobbs is credited as the recruiter who brought Richard Hamilton, Caron Butler and Khalid El-Amin to UConn, among others, and he was vital in the development of Ray Allen, who still credits him for the development of his strong jumpshot.

During his fourteen years as an assistant coach, Hobbs contributed to a highly successful period for his teams, evidenced by their participation in eight NCAA Tournaments and two NIT appearances. Under his tenure, the team reached the Sweet Sixteen five times and notably secured the 1998–99 National Championship.

During this time, it was natural for Hobbs's name to begin popping up for head coaching vacancies. Some of the various schools at which he was a candidate were the University of New Hampshire, Fordham University, Tulane University, American University, the University of Hartford, the University of Delaware, the University of Miami, Siena College and Drexel University before he finally accepted an offer to become the head coach at George Washington University in May 2001.

=== George Washington ===
On May 7, 2001, Hobbs was named the head coach at the George Washington University after previous coach Tom Penders resigned following a lack of success and a number of scandals in Foggy Bottom. Penders said his resignation was because after 30 years of coaching, it was "time for a sabbatical," and said the resignation was not related to the off-the-court issues.

Hobbs won his first Atlantic 10 Conference Championship in 2005, the first in GW history, and then added the second in 2007 in Atlantic City. On January 3, 2007 he achieved his 100th win at the Smith Center over Fordham.

Hobbs was known for his enthusiastic demeanor on the sidelines. He is known for his intensity, fast substitutions and frequent whistling and hollering. His teams were typically characterized by their frenetic, trapping defense which has led the Colonials to be one of the top teams in steals. Additionally, he tended to recruit stocky guards and pencil-thin athletic forwards while coaching one of the quickest teams in the country that force turnovers with full-court defense.

Two of Hobbs's players at George Washington played in the NBA and a third was drafted in the second round in 2006. They are: Pops Mensah-Bonsu, Mike Hall and J. R. Pinnock. Yet, after making it to the NCAA tournament the following season, Hobbs's squad missed the A-10 tournament for two consecutive years leading fans to call for his firing.

To start the 2009–10 season, Hobbs brought in a 6-player recruiting class in which (as of December 21, 2009) four players average at least 15 minutes per game. He also added former Michigan Head Coach Brian Ellerbe to his staff to replace Darrell Brooks, who left to become the head coach at Bowie State University. Hobbs has led his team to an 11–4 record to start the season, prompting local media to note that Hobbs' team re-energized the campus and kick-started its rebuilding process. The Colonials finished the season with a winning season for the first time in three years, and Hobbs had two players receive conference postseason honors for the first time in three years as well. Freshman Lasan Kromah was named to the Atlantic 10 All-Rookie Team and Senior Damian Hollis was named an Atlantic 10 Honorable Mention.

The turnaround in victories coincided with an increased presence for Coach Hobbs in communication with fans and on television. Hobbs partnered with local television personality Ron Harris for The Karl Hobbs Show which aired on MASN through the 2009–10 basketball season.

On April 25, 2011, it was announced that George Washington had released Hobbs from his contract. Officials stated that "The university determined that now is the time for new leadership of GW’s men’s basketball team"

=== Return to UConn ===
After leaving George Washington, Hobbs returned to the University of Connecticut, serving under Jim Calhoun in the role of Director of Men's Basketball Administration, where he was tasked with managing film, compliance, travel and the relationship between the team and the greater university. His arrival came on the heels of a series of sanctions on the UConn program for recruiting violations.

After the retirement of Jim Calhoun, new head coach Kevin Ollie tapped Hobbs as an assistant coach in July 2012. Hobbs and fellow assistant Glenn Miller were assistant coaches when Ollie was a player. In 2014, UConn defeated Kentucky for the national championship, Hobbs' second on the Connecticut staff.

=== Rutgers ===
Hobbs joined the staff of his former George Washington assistant coach Steve Pikiell at Rutgers, assuming the role of associate head coach.

== Head coaching record ==
Record table
Season	Team	Overall	Conference	Standing	Postseason
George Washington Colonials (Atlantic 10 Conference) (2001–2011)
2001–02	George Washington	12–16	5–11	5th (West)	
2002–03	George Washington	12–17	5–11	T–4th (West)	
2003–04	George Washington	18–12	11–5	2nd (West)	NIT First Round
2004–05	George Washington	22–8	11–5	1st (West)	NCAA Division I First Round
2005–06	George Washington	27–3	16–0	1st	NCAA Division I Second Round
2006–07	George Washington	23–9	11–5	3rd	NCAA Division I First Round
2007–08	George Washington	9–17	5–11	13th	
2008–09	George Washington	10–18	4–12	13th	
2009–10	George Washington	16–15	6–10	10th	CBI First Round
2010–11	George Washington	17–14	10–6	T–4th	
George Washington:		166–129	84–76		
Total:		166–129			
National champion Postseason invitational champion Conference regular season champion Conference regular season and conference tournament champion Division regular season champion Division regular season and conference tournament champion Conference tournament champion
