= 2004–05 Eastern Kentucky Colonels basketball team =

American college basketball season

2004–05 Eastern Kentucky Colonels basketball
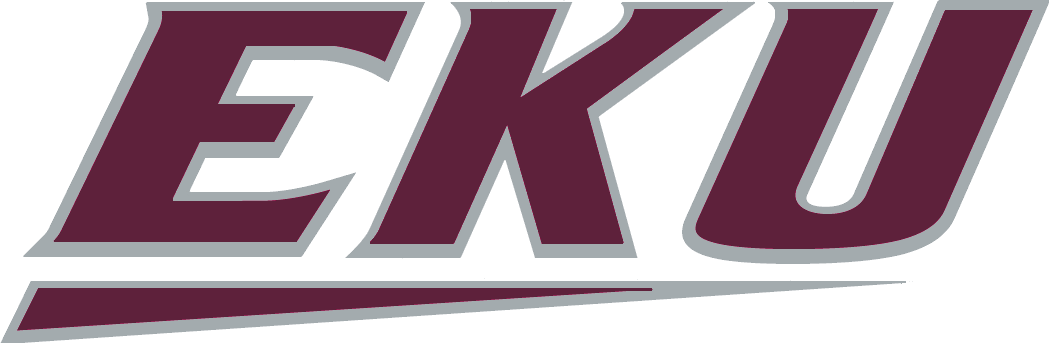

Ohio Valley tournament champions

NCAA tournament, round of 64
- Conference: Ohio Valley Conference
- East Division
- Record: 22–9 (11–5 OVC)
- Head coach: Travis Ford (5th season)
- Home arena: McBrayer Arena

2004–05 Ohio Valley Conference men's basketball standings
	Conf.				Overall
Team	W		L	PCT	W		L	PCT
Tennessee Tech	12	–	4	.750	18	–	11	.621
Eastern Kentucky †	11	–	5	.688	22	–	9	.710
Murray State	11	–	5	.688	17	–	11	.607
Samford	10	–	6	.625	15	–	13	.536
Austin Peay	9	–	7	.563	13	–	19	.406
Southeast Missouri State	9	–	7	.563	15	–	14	.517
Tennessee State	9	–	7	.563	14	–	17	.452
Eastern Illinois	7	–	9	.438	12	–	16	.429
Morehead State	5	–	11	.313	11	–	16	.407
UT Martin	3	–	13	.188	6	–	21	.222
Jacksonville State	2	–	14	.125	7	–	22	.241
† 2005 Ohio Valley Conference tournament winner Rankings from AP Poll

The 2004–05 Eastern Kentucky Colonels basketball team represented Eastern Kentucky University during the 2004–05 NCAA Division I men's basketball season. The Colonels, led by fifth-year head coach Travis Ford, played their home games at McBrayer Arena within Alumni Coliseum and were members of the East Division of the Ohio Valley Conference. They finished the season 22–9, 11–5 in OVC play to finish in second place. They were champions of the OVC tournament to earn an automatic bid to the NCAA tournament – the program's first appearance since 1979. Playing as No. 15 seed in the South region, the Colonels lost in the opening round to No. 2 seed Kentucky.

== Roster ==
2004–05 Eastern Kentucky Colonels men's basketball team
Players
Coaches

Pos.	#	Name	Height	Weight	Year	Hometown
G	12	Matt Witt	6 ft 0 in (1.83 m)	180 lb (82 kg)	Jr	Tipp City, Ohio
G	33	Zach Ingles	6 ft 2 in (1.88 m)	190 lb (86 kg)	Jr	Gowen, Michigan
F	35	Michael Haney	6 ft 6 in (1.98 m)	210 lb (95 kg)	Sr	Madisonville, Kentucky

Head coach

- Travis Ford

Assistant coach(es)

Legend

- (C) Team captain
- (S) Suspended
- (I) Ineligible
- (W) Walk-on
- Injured
- Current redshirt

Roster

== Schedule and results ==
Date time, TV	Rank^{#}	Opponent^{#}	Result	Record	Site (attendance) city, state
Regular season
Nov 21, 2004*; 2:00 p.m.		at Dayton	W 73–66	1–0	UD Arena (12,254); Dayton, Ohio
Nov 23, 2004*; 7:30 p.m.		Webster	W 102–47	2–0	McBrayer Arena (2,800); Richmond, Kentucky
Nov 27, 2004*; 7:30 p.m.		Mount St. Joseph	W 103–75	3–0	McBrayer Arena (2,450); Richmond, Kentucky
Dec 2, 2004*; 7:30 p.m.		Savannah State	W 87–59	4–0	McBrayer Arena (2,700); Richmond, Kentucky
Dec 4, 2004*; 7:00 p.m.		at Coastal Carolina	W 77–62	5–0	Kimbel Arena (891); Conway, South Carolina
Dec 8, 2004*; 8:00 p.m.		at Western Kentucky	L 63–75	5–1	E. A. Diddle Arena (6,478); Bowling Green, Kentucky
Dec 11, 2004*; 7:30 p.m.		at Robert Morris	W 79–69	6–1	Charles L. Sewall Center (743); Moon Township, Pennsylvania
Dec 14, 2004*; 7:30 p.m.		Greenville	W 87–62	7–1	McBrayer Arena (2,100); Richmond, Kentucky
Dec 20, 2004*; 7:00 p.m.		at Savannah State	W 80–64	8–1	Tiger Arena (151); Savannah, Georgia
Dec 22, 2004*; 7:00 p.m.		at Florida	L 49–98	8–2	Stephen C. O'Connell Center (9,118); Gainesville, Florida
Dec 30, 2004*; 7:30 p.m.		at No. 19 Louisville	L 63–78	8–3	Freedom Hall (19,147); Louisville, Kentucky
Jan 6, 2005; 8:30 p.m.		at UT Martin	W 71–67	9–3 (1–0)	Kathleen and Tom Elam Center (2,341); Martin, Tennessee
Jan 8, 2005; 8:15 p.m.		at Murray State	L 78–80 ^{OT}	9–4 (1–1)	CFSB Center (4,926); Murray, Kentucky
Jan 13, 2005; 8:30 p.m.		at Austin Peay	W 67–63 ^{OT}	10–4 (2–1)	Dunn Center (2,304); Clarksville, Tennessee
Jan 15, 2005; 8:30 p.m.		at Tennessee Tech	L 64–78	10–5 (2–2)	Hooper Eblen Center (4,389); Cookeville, Tennessee
Jan 20, 2005; 7:30 p.m.		Jacksonville State	W 72–60	11–5 (3–2)	McBrayer Arena (2,650); Richmond, Kentucky
Jan 22, 2005; 7:30 p.m.		Samford	L 61–67	11–6 (3–3)	McBrayer Arena (2,900); Richmond, Kentucky
Jan 27, 2005; 7:30 p.m.		Murray State	W 73–61	12–6 (4–3)	McBrayer Arena (3,300); Richmond, Kentucky
Jan 29, 2005; 8:30 p.m.		UT Martin	W 95–71	13–6 (5–3)	McBrayer Arena (3,500); Richmond, Kentucky
Feb 1, 2005; 8:00 p.m.		Morehead State	W 83–69	14–6 (6–3)	McBrayer Arena (4,100); Richmond, Kentucky
Feb 3, 2005; 8:30 p.m.		at Tennessee State	L 63–75	14–7 (6–4)	Gentry Complex (4,859); Nashville, Tennessee
Feb 10, 2005; 8:00 p.m.		at Samford	W 56–53	15–7 (7–4)	Seibert Hall (2,674); Homewood, Alabama
Feb 12, 2005; 8:30 p.m.		at Jacksonville State	L 55–70	15–8 (7–5)	Pete Mathews Coliseum (1,221); Jacksonville, Alabama
Feb 17, 2005; 7:30 p.m.		Southeast Missouri State	W 83–72	16–8 (8–5)	McBrayer Arena (3,200); Richmond, Kentucky
Feb 19, 2005; 7:30 p.m.		Eastern Illinois	W 74–72	17–8 (9–5)	McBrayer Arena (3,450); Richmond, Kentucky
Feb 22, 2005; 7:00 p.m.		at Morehead State	W 69–61	18–8 (10–5)	Ellis Johnson Arena (3,188); Morehead, Kentucky
Feb 26, 2005; 7:30 p.m.		Austin Peay	W 70–66	19–8 (11–5)	McBrayer Arena (4,400); Richmond, Kentucky
Ohio Valley Conference tournament
Mar 1, 2005*; 7:45 p.m.	(2)	(7) Tennessee State; Quarterfinals	W 74–68	20–8	McBrayer Arena (2,400); Richmond, Kentucky
Mar 4, 2005*; 9:00 p.m.	(2)	vs. (6) Southeast Missouri State; Semifinals	W 69–52	21–8	Gaylord Entertainment Center (2,797); Nashville, Tennessee
Mar 5, 2005*; 4:00 p.m., ESPN2	(2)	vs. (5) Austin Peay; Championship game	W 52–46	22–8	Gaylord Entertainment Center (2,574); Nashville, Tennessee
NCAA tournament
Mar 17, 2005*; 12:25 p.m.	(15 S)	vs. (2 S) No. 7 Kentucky; First round	L 64–72	22–9	RCA Dome (28,274); Indianapolis, Indiana
*Non-conference game. ^{#}Rankings from AP Poll, (#) during NCAA Tournament is seed within region S=South. (#) Tournament seedings in parentheses. All times are in Eastern Time.
