= 2005 Ohio Valley Conference men's basketball tournament =

- Classification: Division I
- Season: 2004–05
- Teams: 8
- First round site: Campus Sites
- Semifinals site: Gaylord Entertainment Center; Nashville, Tennessee
- Finals site: Gaylord Entertainment Center; Nashville, Tennessee
- Champions: Eastern Kentucky (4th title)
- Winning coach: Travis Ford (1st title)
- MVP: Michael Haney (Eastern Kentucky)

2004–05 Ohio Valley Conference men's basketball standings
	Conf.				Overall
Team	W		L	PCT	W		L	PCT
Tennessee Tech	12	–	4	.750	18	–	11	.621
Eastern Kentucky †	11	–	5	.688	22	–	9	.710
Murray State	11	–	5	.688	17	–	11	.607
Samford	10	–	6	.625	15	–	13	.536
Austin Peay	9	–	7	.563	13	–	19	.406
Southeast Missouri State	9	–	7	.563	15	–	14	.517
Tennessee State	9	–	7	.563	14	–	17	.452
Eastern Illinois	7	–	9	.438	12	–	16	.429
Morehead State	5	–	11	.313	11	–	16	.407
UT Martin	3	–	13	.188	6	–	21	.222
Jacksonville State	2	–	14	.125	7	–	22	.241
† 2005 Ohio Valley Conference tournament winner Rankings from AP Poll

The 2005 Ohio Valley Conference men's basketball tournament was the postseason men's basketball tournament of the Ohio Valley Conference during the 2004–05 NCAA Division I men's basketball season. It was held March 1–5, 2005. The first round was hosted by the higher seeded team in each game. The semifinals and finals took place at Gaylord Entertainment Center in Nashville, Tennessee.

Second-seeded Eastern Kentucky won the tournament, defeating Austin Peay in the championship game, and received the Ohio Valley's automatic bid to the NCAA tournament. Michael Haney of Eastern Kentucky was named the tournament's most valuable player.

== Format ==
The top eight eligible men's basketball teams in the Ohio Valley Conference receive a berth in the conference tournament. After the regular season, teams were seeded by conference record.

== Bracket ==
Quarterfinals; March 1
1	Tennessee Tech	72
8	Eastern Illinois	68
4	Samford	60
5	Austin Peay	71
3	Murray State	58
6	Southeast Missouri State	74
2	Eastern Kentucky	78
7	Tennessee State	68

Semifinals; March 4
1	Tennessee Tech	61
5	Austin Peay	67
6	Southeast Missouri State	52
2	Eastern Kentucky	69

Finals; March 5
5	Austin Peay	46
2	Eastern Kentucky	52
