= 2006–07 Temple Owls men's basketball team =

American college basketball season

2006–07 Temple Owls men's basketball
- Conference: Atlantic 10 Conference
- Record: 12–18 (6–10 A-10)
- Head coach: Fran Dunphy (1st season)
- Assistant coaches: Dave Duke (1st season); Matt Langel (1st season); Shawn Trice (1st season)
- Home arena: Liacouras Center

2006–07 Atlantic 10 men's basketball standings
| | Conf. | | | | Overall |
| Team | W | | L | PCT | W | | L | PCT |
|---|---|---|---|---|---|---|---|---|
| Xavier | 13 | – | 3 | .813 | 25 | – | 9 | .735 |
| UMass | 13 | – | 3 | .813 | 24 | – | 9 | .727 |
| George Washington † | 11 | – | 5 | .688 | 23 | – | 9 | .719 |
| Fordham | 10 | – | 6 | .625 | 18 | – | 12 | .600 |
| Rhode Island | 10 | – | 6 | .625 | 19 | – | 14 | .576 |
| Saint Joseph's | 9 | – | 7 | .563 | 18 | – | 14 | .563 |
| Dayton | 8 | – | 8 | .500 | 19 | – | 12 | .613 |
| Saint Louis | 8 | – | 8 | .500 | 20 | – | 13 | .606 |
| Charlotte | 7 | – | 9 | .438 | 14 | – | 16 | .467 |
| Temple | 6 | – | 10 | .375 | 12 | – | 18 | .400 |
| Duquesne | 6 | – | 10 | .375 | 10 | – | 19 | .345 |
| Richmond | 4 | – | 12 | .250 | 8 | – | 22 | .267 |
| St. Bonaventure | 4 | – | 12 | .250 | 7 | – | 22 | .241 |
| La Salle | 3 | – | 13 | .188 | 10 | – | 20 | .333 |
† 2007 Atlantic 10 Tournament winner Rankings from AP Poll

The 2006–07 Temple Owls men's basketball team represented Temple University in the 2006–07 NCAA Division I men's basketball season. They were led by first year head coach Fran Dunphy and played their home games at the Liacouras Center. The Owls are members of the Atlantic 10 Conference. They finished the season 12–18 and 6–10 in A-10 play.

== Roster ==
| # | Name | Height | Weight (lbs.) | Position | Class | Hometown | | High school |
|---|---|---|---|---|---|---|---|---|
| 0 | Brian Shanahan | 6 ft 0 in (1.83 m) | 175 pounds (79 kg) | G | So. | Haddon Heights, New Jersey | U.S. | Episcopal Academy |
| 1 | Chris Clark | 5 ft 8 in (1.73 m) | 165 pounds (75 kg) | G | Jr. | Narberth, Pennsylvania | U.S. | St. Joseph's Prep |
| 2 | Ryan Brooks | 6 ft 4 in (1.93 m) | 200 pounds (91 kg) | G | Fr. | Narberth, Pennsylvania | U.S. | Lower Merion HS |
| 3 | Dustin Salisbery | 6 ft 5 in (1.96 m) | 205 pounds (93 kg) | G | Sr. | Lancaster, Pennsylvania | U.S. | J.P. McCaskey HS |
| 4 | Dion Dacons | 6 ft 6 in (1.98 m) | 210 pounds (95 kg) | F | Sr. | Statesville, North Carolina | U.S. | Oak Hill Academy |
| 10 | Luis Guzman | 6 ft 3 in (1.91 m) | 200 pounds (91 kg) | G | Fr. | New York City, New York | U.S. | Paramus Catholic HS |
| 13 | Mark Tyndale | 6 ft 5 in (1.96 m) | 210 pounds (95 kg) | G | Jr. | Philadelphia, Pennsylvania | U.S. | Simon Gratz HS |
| 15 | Semaj Inge | 6 ft 4 in (1.93 m) | 190 pounds (86 kg) | G | So. | Camden, New Jersey | U.S. | Woodrow Wilson HS |
| 21 | Rafael DeLeon | 6 ft 5 in (1.96 m) | 200 pounds (91 kg) | F | Fr. | District Heights, Maryland | U.S. | Bishop McNamara HS |
| 22 | Dionte Christmas | 6 ft 5 in (1.96 m) | 205 pounds (93 kg) | G | So. | Philadelphia, Pennsylvania | U.S. | Lutheran Christian Academy |
| 32 | DaShone Kirkendoll | 6 ft 5 in (1.96 m) | 210 pounds (95 kg) | G | Jr. | Dayton, Ohio | U.S. | Stebbins HS |
| 41 | Sergio Olmos | 7 ft 0 in (2.13 m) | 220 pounds (100 kg) | C | So. | Valencia | Spain | Vincente Blasco Ibanez HS |
| 43 | Orlando Miller | 6 ft 6 in (1.98 m) | 190 pounds (86 kg) | F | Jr. | Lanham, Maryland | U.S. | High Point HS |
| 44 | Anthony Ivory | 6 ft 10 in (2.08 m) | 350 pounds (160 kg) | C | So. | Washington, DC | U.S. | Marriott Charter School |
