= 2006–07 Dayton Flyers men's basketball team =

American college basketball season

2006–07 Dayton Flyers men's basketball
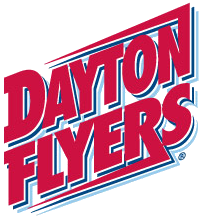
- Conference: Atlantic 10 Conference
- Record: 19–12 (8–8 A-10)
- Head coach: Brian Gregory (4th season)
- Assistant coaches: Billy Schmidt; Reggie Rankin; Bob Beyer
- Home arena: University of Dayton Arena

2006–07 Atlantic 10 men's basketball standings
	Conf.				Overall
Team	W		L	PCT	W		L	PCT
Xavier	13	–	3	.813	25	–	9	.735
UMass	13	–	3	.813	24	–	9	.727
George Washington †	11	–	5	.688	23	–	9	.719
Fordham	10	–	6	.625	18	–	12	.600
Rhode Island	10	–	6	.625	19	–	14	.576
Saint Joseph's	9	–	7	.563	18	–	14	.563
Dayton	8	–	8	.500	19	–	12	.613
Saint Louis	8	–	8	.500	20	–	13	.606
Charlotte	7	–	9	.438	14	–	16	.467
Temple	6	–	10	.375	12	–	18	.400
Duquesne	6	–	10	.375	10	–	19	.345
Richmond	4	–	12	.250	8	–	22	.267
St. Bonaventure	4	–	12	.250	7	–	22	.241
La Salle	3	–	13	.188	10	–	20	.333
† 2007 Atlantic 10 Tournament winner Rankings from AP Poll

The 2006–07 Dayton Flyers men's basketball team represented the University of Dayton during the 2006–07 NCAA Division I men's basketball season. The Flyers, led by fourth year head coach Brian Gregory, played their home games at the University of Dayton Arena and were members of the Atlantic 10 Conference. They finished the season 19–12, 8–8 in A-10 play. The Flyers started the season 10-1, with wins over NCAA Tournament teams Louisville, Holy Cross, and Creighton, before stumbling during A-10 play. The Flyers advanced to the quarterfinals of the Atlantic 10 tournament where they lost to regular season champion Xavier. Dayton was not selected to play in a postseason tournament, marking the 3rd consecutive season the Flyers did not play in a postseason tournament.

== Previous season ==
The 2005–06 Dayton Flyers finished the season 14–17, with a record of 6–10 in the Atlantic 10 regular season. The Flyers season ended in the first round of the 2006 Atlantic 10 men's basketball tournament against Saint Joseph's.

== Incoming recruits ==
College recruiting information
Name	Hometown	School	Height	Weight	Commit date
Kurt Huelsman; F	St. Henry, OH	St. Henry	6 ft 10 in (2.08 m)	245 lb (111 kg)	May 11, 2005
Kurt Huelsman; F	Recruit ratings: Scout: Rivals: (N/A)				
Marcus Johnson; G	Akron, OH	St. Vincent-St. Mary	6 ft 2 in (1.88 m)	180 lb (82 kg)	Aug 11, 2005
Marcus Johnson; G	Recruit ratings: Scout: Rivals: (N/A)				
Andres Sandoval; G	Gainesville, FL	Santa Fe CC	6 ft 4 in (1.93 m)	195 lb (88 kg)	Oct 14, 2005
Andres Sandoval; G	Recruit ratings: Scout: Rivals: (N/A)				
London Warren; G	Jacksonville, FL	Raines	6 ft 1 in (1.85 m)	169 lb (77 kg)	Oct 24, 2005
London Warren; G	Recruit ratings: Scout: Rivals: (N/A)				
Overall recruit ranking:
Note: In many cases, Scout, Rivals, 247Sports, On3, and ESPN may conflict in their listings of height and weight.; In these cases, the average was taken. ESPN grades are on a 100-point scale.; Sources: "2006 Team Ranking". Rivals.

== Roster ==
2006–07 Dayton Flyers men's basketball team
Players
Coaches

Pos.	#	Name	Height	Weight	Year	Previous school	Hometown
F	1	Monty Scott	6 ft 6 in (1.98 m)	230 lb (104 kg)	Sr	Reynoldsburg	Reynoldsburg, OH
G	2	Brian Roberts	6 ft 2 in (1.88 m)	175 lb (79 kg)	Jr	St. John's	Toledo, OH
G	3	Andres Sandoval	6 ft 4 in (1.93 m)	198 lb (90 kg)	RS Jr	Winchendon/Santa Fe CC	Milford, MA
F/C	5	Nick Stafford	6 ft 8 in (2.03 m)	225 lb (102 kg)	Jr	Worcester	Springfield, MA
G	14	London Warren	6 ft 0 in (1.83 m)	176 lb (80 kg)	Fr	Raines	Jacksonville, FL
F	15	Charles Little	6 ft 6 in (1.98 m)	224 lb (102 kg)	So	Cleveland	Cleveland, TN
F	20	Desmond Adedeji	6 ft 9 in (2.06 m)	298 lb (135 kg)	So	DeMatha	Landover Hills, MD
F	21	Norman Plummer	6 ft 7 in (2.01 m)	238 lb (108 kg)	Jr	Hargrave Military	Cincinnati, OH
F	24	Luke Hendrick (W)	6 ft 4 in (1.93 m)	170 lb (77 kg)	Fr	Nouvel Catholic Central	Saginaw, MI
G	25	Matt Hogan (W)	6 ft 1 in (1.85 m)	185 lb (84 kg)	Fr	Libertyville	Libertyville, IL
G	30	Dan Fox (W)	6 ft 4 in (1.93 m)	190 lb (86 kg)	So	Lakeland	Wolcottville, IN
G	32	Marcus Johnson	6 ft 3 in (1.91 m)	186 lb (84 kg)	Fr	St. Vincent-St. Mary	Cleveland, OH
F	33	Jimmy Binnie	6 ft 7 in (2.01 m)	210 lb (95 kg)	Jr	Johnston	Des Moines, IA
F/C	41	Kurt Huelsman	6 ft 10 in (2.08 m)	232 lb (105 kg)	Fr	St. Henry	St. Henry, OH

Head coach

- Brian Gregory (Oakland)

Assistant coach(es)

- Billy Schmidt (Wake Forest)
- Reggie Rankin (Ohio)
- Bob Beyer (Alfred)

Legend

- (C) Team captain
- (S) Suspended
- (I) Ineligible
- (W) Walk-on
- Injured
- Current redshirt

Roster

== Schedule ==
Date time, TV	Rank^{#}	Opponent^{#}	Result	Record	Site (attendance) city, state
Exhibition
11/02/2006*		Northwood	W 66-51	–	UD Arena; Dayton, OH
11/06/2006*		Georgetown (KY)	W 101-68	–	UD Arena; Dayton, OH
Non-conference regular season
11/11/2006*; 2:00 pm		Austin Peay	W 78–62	1–0	UD Arena (12,059); Dayton, OH
11/15/2006*; 7:00 pm		North Carolina A&T	W 79-66	2-0	UD Arena (11,666); Dayton, OH
11/18/2006*; 8:00 pm		at SMU	L 48-53	2–1	Moody Coliseum (2,707); Dallas, TX
11/21/2007*; 8:00 pm		Yale	W 73-62	3–1	UD Arena (12,028); Dayton, OH
11/24/2006*; 5:00 pm		vs. Louisville	W 68–64	4–1	U.S. Bank Arena (8,250); Cincinnati, OH
11/28/2006*; 7:00 pm		South Carolina State	W 67-55	5–1	UD Arena (11,425); Dayton, OH
12/02/2006*; 7:00 pm		Holy Cross	W 69–53	6–1	UD Arena (12,149); Dayton, OH
12/06/2006*; 9:00 pm		Creighton	W 60-54	7–1	UD Arena (11,895); Dayton, OH
12/09/2006*; 7:00 pm		Grambling State	W 58-49	8–1	UD Arena (12,009); Dayton, OH
12/16/2006*; 8:00 pm		Western Carolina	W 66–55	9–1	UD Arena (12,354); Dayton, OH
12/20/2007*; 7:00 pm		Miami (OH)	W 56–54	10–1	UD Arena (12,508); Dayton, OH
12/23/2006*; 8:00 pm		at No. 7 Pittsburgh	L 54–84	10–2	Petersen Events Center (12,508); Pittsburgh, PA
12/31/2006*; 3:00 pm		at No. 2 North Carolina	L 51-81	10-3	Dean Smith Center (19,967); Chapel Hill, NC
Atlantic 10 regular season
01/04/2007; 7:00 pm		Charlotte	W 66–63	11–3 (1–0)	UD Arena (11,655); Dayton, OH
01/07/2007; 12:00 pm		at Rams	L 74-75	11–4 (1–1)	Ryan Center (3,791); Kingston, RI
01/13/2007; 7:00 pm		La Salle	W 84–82	12–4 (2–1)	UD Arena (12,819); Dayton, OH
01/17/2007; 7:00 pm		at Charlotte	L 59–80	12–5 (2–2)	Halton Arena (6,378); Charlotte, NC
01/20/2007; 7:00 pm		Richmond	W 72-54	13–5 (3–2)	UD Arena (12,727); Dayton, OH
01/24/2007; 7:00 pm		at Duquesne	L 89-93	13–6 (3–3)	Palumbo Center (1,743); Pittsburgh, PA
01/27/2007; 12:00 pm		at Xavier; Blackburn/McCafferty Trophy	L 67-83	13–7 (3–4)	Cintas Center (10,250); Cincinnati, OH
01/31/2007; 7:00 pm		George Washington	W 84–69	14–7 (4–4)	UD Arena (11,622); Dayton, OH
02/04/2007; 12:00 pm		at Saint Joseph's	L 65–71	14–8 (4–5)	Alumni Memorial Fieldhouse (3,103); Philadelphia, PA
02/07/2007; 7:00 pm		Fordham	W 57-45	15–8 (5–5)	UD Arena (11,853); Dayton, OH
02/10/2007; 12:00 pm		at St. Bonaventure	W 69–62	16–8 (6–5)	Reilly Center (3,358); Olean, NY
02/18/2007; 2:00 pm		Massachusetts	L 69–77	16-9 (6–6)	UD Arena (13,213); Dayton, OH
02/21/2007; 7:00 pm		at Saint Louis	L 56–66	16–10 (6–7)	Savvis Center (8,847); St. Louis, MO
02/24/2007; 6:00 pm		Xavier; Blackburn/McCafferty Trophy	L 67-75	16–11 (6–8)	UD Arena (13,435); Dayton, OH
02/28/2007; 7:00 pm		at Temple	W 73-65	17–11 (7–8)	Liacouras Center (3,414); Philadelphia, PA
03/03/2007; 7:00 pm		Saint Louis	W 65-64 ^{2ot}	18–11 (8–8)	UD Arena (13,435); Dayton, OH
Atlantic 10 tournament
03/07/2007; 12:00 pm	(8)	vs. (9) Charlotte; First Round	W 81–63	19-11	Boardwalk Hall (4,406); Atlantic City, NJ
03/08/2007; 12:05 pm	(8)	vs. (1) Xavier; Quarterfinals	L 51–72	19-12	Boardwalk Hall (4,401); Atlantic City, NJ
*Non-conference game. ^{#}Rankings from AP Poll. (#) Tournament seedings in parentheses. All times are in Eastern Time.
