= 2006–07 Illinois State Redbirds men's basketball team =

American college basketball season

2006–07 Illinois State Redbirds men's basketball
- Conference: Missouri Valley Conference
- Record: 15–16 (6–12 MVC)
- Head coach: Porter Moser (4th season)
- Assistant coaches: Brian Barone; Daniyal Robinson; Chris Jans
- Home arena: Redbird Arena

2006–07 Missouri Valley Conference men's basketball standings
	Conf.				Overall
Team	W		L	PCT	W		L	PCT
No. 14 Southern Illinois	15	–	3	.833	29	–	7	.806
Creighton †	13	–	5	.722	22	–	11	.667
Missouri State	12	–	6	.667	22	–	11	.667
Bradley	10	–	8	.556	22	–	13	.629
Northern Iowa	9	–	9	.500	18	–	13	.581
Wichita State	8	–	10	.444	17	–	14	.548
Illinois State	6	–	12	.333	15	–	16	.484
Evansville	6	–	12	.333	14	–	17	.452
Drake	6	–	12	.333	17	–	15	.531
Indiana State	5	–	13	.278	13	–	18	.419
† 2007 MVC tournament winner Rankings from AP poll

The 2006–07 Illinois State Redbirds men's basketball team represented Illinois State University during the 2006–07 NCAA Division I men's basketball season. The Redbirds, led by fourth year head coach Porter Moser, played their home games at Redbird Arena and competed as a member of the Missouri Valley Conference.

They finished the season 15–16, 6–12 in conference play to finish in a tie for seventh place. They were the number seven seed for the 2007 Missouri Valley Conference men's basketball tournament. They were defeated by Indiana State University in their opening round game.

== Roster ==
2006–07 Illinois State Redbirds men's basketball team
Players
Coaches

Pos.	#	Name	Height	Weight	Year	Hometown
F	50	Greg Dilligard	6 ft 8 in (2.03 m)	—	Sr	La Belle, MO
G	1	Roberto Fortes	6 ft 4 in (1.93 m)	—	Sr	Fort Wayne, IN
C	51	Ronnie Carlwell	6 ft 11 in (2.11 m)	—	RS Jr	Maywood, IL
C	32	Levi Dyer	6 ft 10 in (2.08 m)	—	Jr	Eaton, CO
G	10	Dom Johnson	6 ft 0 in (1.83 m)	—	Jr	Bell City, MO
G	22	Julius Moor	6 ft 3 in (1.91 m)	—	Jr	Kieler, WI
G	5	Keith Richardson	5 ft 8 in (1.73 m)	—	Jr	Kansas City, KS
F	4	Anthony Slack	6 ft 7 in (2.01 m)	—	Jr	New Orleans, LA
G	45	Brandon Holtz	6 ft 4 in (1.93 m)	—	So	Bloomington, IL
F	42	Dinma Odiakosa (redshirt)	6 ft 8 in (2.03 m)	—	So	Akwukwu-Igbo, Nigeria
G	25	Sead Odzic (I)	6 ft 3 in (1.91 m)	—	So	Skokie, IL
F	31	Mike Vandello	6 ft 7 in (2.01 m)	—	So	Bettendorf, IA
G	0	Osiris Eldridge	6 ft 3 in (1.91 m)	—	Fr	Chicago, IL
F	24	Bobby Hill	6 ft 3 in (1.91 m)	—	Fr	St. Louis, MO

Head coach

- Porter Moser (Creighton)

Assistant coach(es)

- Brian Barone (Marquette)
- Daniyal Robinson (Little Rock)
- Chris Jans (Loras)

Legend

- (C) Team captain
- (S) Suspended
- (I) Ineligible
- (W) Walk-on
- Injured
- Current redshirt

== Schedule ==
Date time, TV	Rank^{#}	Opponent^{#}	Result	Record	High points	High rebounds	High assists	Site (attendance) city, state
Exhibition Season
November 1, 2006*; 7:05 pm		Missouri–St. Louis	W 83–58		13 – Eldridge	11 – Slack	–	Redbird Arena; Normal, IL
Regular Season
November 12, 2006*; 4:00 pm		vs. Southern Methodist; Colonial Classic [Quarterfinal]	L 55–57	0–1	15 – Johnson	12 – Slack	4 – Richardson	Donald L. Tucker Civic Center (6,807); Tallahassee, FL
November 13, 2006*; 6:30 pm		at Florida State; Colonial Classic [Consolation Semifinal]	L 59–73	0–2	32 – Johnson	5 – Slack	4 – Johnson, Richardson	Donald L. Tucker Civic Center (6,897); Tallahassee, FL
November 14, 2006*; 4:00 pm		vs. McNeese State; Colonial Classic [Seventh Place]	W 67–50	1–2	23 – Richardson	8 – Slack	7 – Richardson	Donald L. Tucker Civic Center (6,780); Tallahassee, FL
November 20, 2006*; 7:05 pm		California State–Northridge	W 66–44	2–2	16 – Johnson	7 – Slack	8 – Richardson	Redbird Arena (4,699); Normal, IL
November 25, 2006*; 6:30 pm		at St. John's	W 78–65	3–2	18 – Richardson	11 – Dilligard	4 – Dilligard, Richardson	Carnesecca Arena (4,038); New York, NY
November 29, 2006*; 7:05 pm		California State–Sacramento	W 86–69	4–2	21 – Slack	10 – Dilligard, Slack	8 – Richardson	Redbird Arena (5,417); Normal, IL
December 2, 2006*; 7:05 pm		Texas–Arlington	W 86–61	5–2	17 – Dyer	4 – Dyer	7 – Richardson	Redbird Arena (5,941); Normal, IL
December 5, 2006*; 7:05 pm		Miami (Ohio)	W 64–40	6–2	15 – Slack	10 – Dilligard, Slack	4 – Richardson	Redbird Arena (5,735); Normal, IL
December 9, 2006; 2:05 pm		at Evansville	L 41–69	6–3 (0–1)	11 – Johnson	9 – Dilligard	2 – Dilligard, Fortes, Richardson	Roberts Municipal Stadium (5,806); Evansville, IN
December 16, 2006*; 1:05 pm		at Western Michigan	L 57–65	6–4	15 – Fortes	7 – Dilligard	6 – Richardson	University Arena (3,091); Kalamazoo, MI
December 19, 2006*; 7:05 pm		Lewis	W 85–66	7–4	22 – Slack	5 – Vandello	11 – Richardson	Redbird Arena (3,691); Normal, IL
December 23, 2006*; 2:00 pm		at Illinois–Chicago	W 77–69	8–4	19 – Eldridge	8 – Slack	7 – Richardson	UIC Pavilion (4,827); Chicago, IL
December 29, 2006; 6:05 pm		Southern Illinois	L 49–68	8–5 (0–2)	11 – Johnson	10 – Slack	3 – Johnson, Richardson	Redbird Arena (6,429); Normal, IL
January 1, 2007; 3:05 pm		at Creighton	L 71–79	8–6 (0–3)	28 – Eldridge	3 – Dyer, Richardson, Eldridge	9 – Richardson	Qwest Center Omaha (14,869); Omaha, NE
January 6, 2007; 7:05 pm		Indiana State	L 50–54	8–7 (0–4)	11 – Dyer	10 – Dilligard	6 – Richardson	Redbird Arena (4,543); Normal, IL
January 9, 2007; 7:05 pm		Northern Iowa	W 67–64 ^{OT}	9–7 (1–4)	20 – Dyer	7 – Dilligard	4 – Johnson, Richardson	Redbird Arena (3,585); Normal, IL
January 13, 2007; 7:05 pm		at Drake	L 66–70	9–8 (1–5)	24 – Richardson	13 – Dyer	5 – Johnson	The Knapp Center (4,735); Des Monies, IA
January 15, 2007; 7:05 pm		Missouri State	L 66–75	9–9 (1–6)	23 – Dyer	7 – Eldridge	8 – Johnson	Redbird Arena (4,191); Normal, IL
January 18, 2007; 7:05 pm		Wichita State	W 83–75	10–9 (2–6)	20 – Dyer	6 – Eldridge	5 – Richardson	Redbird Arena (5,422); Normal, IL
January 21, 2007; 12:05 pm		Drake	W 80–65	11–9 (3–6)	27 – Dyer	7 – Eldridge	6 – Johnson, Richardson	Redbird Arena (3,988); Normal, IL
January 24, 2007; 7:35 pm, WEEK		at Bradley	L 67–88	11–10 (3–7)	18 – Dilligard	6 – Eldridge	3 – Johnson	Carver Arena (11,444); Peoria, IL
January 27, 2007; 2:05 pm		at Southern Illinois	L 62–73	11–11 (3–8)	18 – Dyer	8 – Eldridge	5 – Richardson	SIU Arena (8,608); Carbondale, IL
January 30, 2007; 7:05 pm		Evansville	W 65–61	12–11 (4–8)	14 – Slack, Eldridge	9 – Slack	5 – Richardson	Redbird Arena (4,560); Normal, IL
February 3, 2007; 7:05 pm, WMBD		Bradley	L 62–70	12–12 (4–9)	14 – Johnson	10 – Dilligard	6 – Dyer	Redbird Arena (9,294); Normal, IL
February 6, 2007; 8:05 pm, ESPNU		at Missouri State	L 61–73	12–13 (4–10)	17 – Dyer	5 – Eldridge	4 – Richardson	John Q. Hammons Student Center (6,827); Springfield, MO
February 11, 2007; 2:05 pm		at Wichita State	L 64–69	12–14 (4–11)	22 – Dyer	7 – Dilligard	6 – Johnson	Charles Koch Arena (10,478); Wichita, KS
February 14, 2007; 6:05 pm		at Indiana State	W 68–53	13–14 (5–11)	18 – Dyer	10 – Dilligard	5 – Richardson	Hulman Center (3,004); Terre Haute, IN
February 17, 2007*; 4:05 pm		Ball State; O’Reilly ESPNU BracketBusters	W 70–57	14–14	29 – Dyer	9 – Slack	9 – Richardson	Redbird Arena (4,050); Normal, IL
February 20, 2007; 7:05 pm		Creighton	W 65–55	15–14 (6–11)	18 – Eldrdige	9 – Slack	3 – Johnson	Redbird Arena (4,835); Normal, IL
February 24, 2007; 7:05 pm		at Northern Iowa	L 66–71	15–15 (6–12)	17 – Dyer	9 – Dilligard	6 – Richardson	McLeod Center (6,117); Cedar Falls, IA
State Farm Missouri Valley Conference {MVC} tournament
March 1, 2007*; 8:35 pm	(7)	vs. (10) Indiana State; Opening Round	L 65–68	15–16	18 – Eldridge	6 – Dilligard, Slack	4 – Johnson	Scottrade Center (8,013); St. Louis, MO
*Non-conference game. ^{#}Rankings from AP Poll. (#) Tournament seedings in parentheses. All times are in Central Standard Time.
