= 2006–07 Creighton Bluejays men's basketball team =

American college basketball season

2006–07 Creighton Bluejays men's basketball
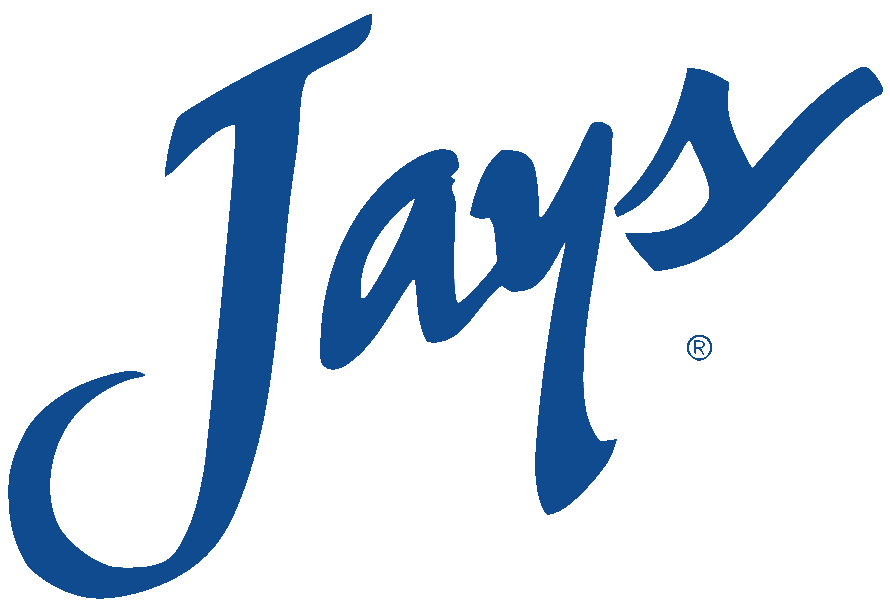

NCAA Tournament, First Round
- Conference: Missouri Valley Conference
- Record: 22–11 (13–5 MVC)
- Head coach: Dana Altman (13th season)
- Home arena: Qwest Center Omaha

2006–07 Missouri Valley Conference men's basketball standings
| | Conf. | | | | Overall |
| Team | W | | L | PCT | W | | L | PCT |
|---|---|---|---|---|---|---|---|---|
| No. 14 Southern Illinois | 15 | – | 3 | .833 | 29 | – | 7 | .806 |
| Creighton † | 13 | – | 5 | .722 | 22 | – | 11 | .667 |
| Missouri State | 12 | – | 6 | .667 | 22 | – | 11 | .667 |
| Bradley | 10 | – | 8 | .556 | 22 | – | 13 | .629 |
| Northern Iowa | 9 | – | 9 | .500 | 18 | – | 13 | .581 |
| Wichita State | 8 | – | 10 | .444 | 17 | – | 14 | .548 |
| Illinois State | 6 | – | 12 | .333 | 15 | – | 16 | .484 |
| Evansville | 6 | – | 12 | .333 | 14 | – | 17 | .452 |
| Drake | 6 | – | 12 | .333 | 17 | – | 15 | .531 |
| Indiana State | 5 | – | 13 | .278 | 13 | – | 18 | .419 |
† 2007 MVC tournament winner Rankings from AP poll

The 2006–07 Creighton Bluejays men's basketball team represented Creighton University in the 2006–07 NCAA Division I men's basketball season. Led by head coach Dana Altman in his 13th season, the Bluejays would end the season with a record of 22–11 (13-5 MVC). They won the 2007 MVC Tournament to receive an automatic bid to the NCAA Tournament. Playing as the No. 10 seed in the South region, Creighton was beaten by No. 7 seed Nevada in the opening round. This was Coach Altman's 7th and final NCAA Tournament team as head coach of the Jays.

== Roster ==
2006–07 Creighton Bluejays men's basketball team
Players
Coaches

| Pos. | # | Name | Height | Weight | Year | Hometown |
|---|---|---|---|---|---|---|
| G | 0 | Isacc Miles | 6 ft 2 in (1.88 m) | 205 lb (93 kg) | Fr | Kansas City, Missouri |
| G | 3 | Nick Porter | 6 ft 3 in (1.91 m) | 210 lb (95 kg) | Sr | Compton, California |
| G | 5 | Dustin Sitzmann | 6 ft 0 in (1.83 m) | 180 lb (82 kg) | So | LeMars, Iowa |
| G | 10 | Nate Funk | 6 ft 3 in (1.91 m) | 195 lb (88 kg) | Sr | Sioux City, Iowa |
| G | 12 | Josh Dotzler | 6 ft 1 in (1.85 m) | 175 lb (79 kg) | So | Omaha, Nebraska |
| G | 20 | Pierce Hibma | 6 ft 5 in (1.96 m) | 205 lb (93 kg) | Jr | Pella, Iowa |
| F | 21 | Ty Morrison | 6 ft 7 in (2.01 m) | 200 lb (91 kg) | Jr | Phoenix, Arizona |
| C | 22 | Manny Gakou | 6 ft 8 in (2.03 m) | 255 lb (116 kg) | Sr |
| G | 24 | Brice Nengsu | 6 ft 5 in (1.96 m) | 200 lb (91 kg) | Jr |
| C | 25 | Kenny Lawson | 6 ft 9 in (2.06 m) | 250 lb (113 kg) | Fr | Oceanside, California |
| G | 34 | Nick Bahe | 6 ft 2 in (1.88 m) | 185 lb (84 kg) | Jr | Lincoln, Nebraska |
| C | 44 | Anthony Tolliver | 6 ft 8 in (2.03 m) | 240 lb (109 kg) | Sr | Springfield, Missouri |
| F | 50 | Dane Watts | 6 ft 8 in (2.03 m) | 225 lb (102 kg) | Jr | Warrensburg, Missouri |

Head coach

- Dana Altman

Assistant coach(es)

Legend

- (C) Team captain
- (S) Suspended
- (I) Ineligible
- (W) Walk-on
- Injured
- Current redshirt

== Schedule and results ==
| Date time, TV | Rank^{#} | Opponent^{#} | Result | Record | Site city, state |
Regular Season
| Nov 13, 2006* | | Mississippi Valley State | W 78–42 | 1–0 | Qwest Center Omaha; Omaha, Nebraska |
| Nov 18, 2006* | | at Nebraska; Rivalry | L 61–73 | 1–1 | Bob Devaney Sports Center; Lincoln, Nebraska |
| Nov 25, 2006* | | George Mason | W 58–56 | 2–1 | Qwest Center Omaha; Omaha, Nebraska |
| Nov 29, 2006* | | Arkansas-Pine Bluff | W 74–39 | 3–1 | Qwest Center Omaha; Omaha, Nebraska |
| Dec 6, 2006* | | at Dayton | L 54–60 | 3–2 | UD Arena; Dayton, Ohio |
| Dec 9, 2006* | | No. 24 Xavier | W 73–67 | 4–2 | Qwest Center Omaha; Omaha, Nebraska |
| Dec 16, 2006* | | at Fresno State | L 54–69 | 4–3 | Fresno, California |
| Dec 21, 2006* | | vs. Valparaiso | W 68–43 | 5–3 | Honolulu, Hawaii |
| Dec 22, 2006* | | vs. Houston | W 80–72 | 6–3 | Honolulu, Hawaii |
| Dec 23, 2006* | | at Hawaii | L 60–76 | 6–4 | Honolulu, Hawaii |
MVC Tournament
| Mar 2, 2007* | | vs. Indiana State; Quarterfinals | W 59–38 | 20–10 | Scottrade Center; St. Louis, Missouri |
| Mar 3, 2007* | | vs. Missouri State; Semifinals | W 75–58 | 21–10 | Scottrade Center; St. Louis, Missouri |
| Mar 4, 2007* | | vs. No. 11 Southern Illinois; Championship game | W 67–61 | 22–10 | Scottrade Center; St. Louis, Missouri |
NCAA Tournament
| Mar 16, 2007* | (10 S) | vs. (7 S) No. 15 Nevada; First Round | L 71–77 ^{OT} | 22–11 | New Orleans Arena; New Orleans, Louisiana |
*Non-conference game. ^{#}Rankings from AP Poll. (#) Tournament seedings in parentheses. S=South.
