= 2006–07 George Washington Colonials men's basketball team =

American college basketball season

2006–07 George Washington Colonials men's basketball

Atlantic 10 tournament champion

NCAA tournament, Round of 64
- Conference: Atlantic 10 Conference
- Record: 23–9 (11–5 A-10)
- Head coach: Karl Hobbs (6th season)
- Home arena: Charles E. Smith Center

2006–07 Atlantic 10 men's basketball standings
	Conf.				Overall
Team	W		L	PCT	W		L	PCT
Xavier	13	–	3	.813	25	–	9	.735
UMass	13	–	3	.813	24	–	9	.727
George Washington †	11	–	5	.688	23	–	9	.719
Fordham	10	–	6	.625	18	–	12	.600
Rhode Island	10	–	6	.625	19	–	14	.576
Saint Joseph's	9	–	7	.563	18	–	14	.563
Dayton	8	–	8	.500	19	–	12	.613
Saint Louis	8	–	8	.500	20	–	13	.606
Charlotte	7	–	9	.438	14	–	16	.467
Temple	6	–	10	.375	12	–	18	.400
Duquesne	6	–	10	.375	10	–	19	.345
Richmond	4	–	12	.250	8	–	22	.267
St. Bonaventure	4	–	12	.250	7	–	22	.241
La Salle	3	–	13	.188	10	–	20	.333
† 2007 Atlantic 10 Tournament winner Rankings from AP Poll

The 2006–07 George Washington Colonials men's basketball team represented George Washington University in the 2006–07 NCAA Division I men's basketball season. The Colonials, led by head coach Karl Hobbs, played their home games at the Charles E. Smith Center in Washington, D.C., as members of the Atlantic 10 Conference. After finishing 3rd in the conference regular season standings, the Colonials won the Atlantic 10 tournament to earn an automatic bid to the NCAA tournament as the 11th seed in the East region. George Washington was beaten by 6th seed Vanderbilt in the first round, 77–44.

== Roster ==
2006–07 George Washington Colonials men's basketball team
Players
Coaches

Pos.	#	Name	Height	Weight	Year	Hometown
G	1	Travis King	6 ft 2 in (1.88 m)	—	Fr	New Haven, Connecticut
F	5	Rob Diggs	6 ft 8 in (2.03 m)	—	So	Brandywine, Maryland
G	10	Jeff Del Favero	6 ft 1 in (1.85 m)	—	Fr	Middletown, Connecticut
F	11	Hermann Opoku	6 ft 8 in (2.03 m)	—	Fr	Vienna, Austria
G	12	Johnny Lee	5 ft 8 in (1.73 m)	—	Fr	Nashville, Tennessee
F	15	Cheyenne Moore	6 ft 5 in (1.96 m)	—	So	Baltimore, Maryland
G	22	Damian Hollis	6 ft 8 in (2.03 m)	—	Fr	Fort Lauderdale, Florida
F	23	Régis Koundjia	6 ft 8 in (2.03 m)	—	Sr	Bangui, Central African Republic
G	25	Carl Elliott	6 ft 4 in (1.93 m)	—	Sr	Brooklyn, New York
G	31	Noel Wilmore	6 ft 4 in (1.93 m)	—	So	Philadelphia, Pennsylvania
G	33	Maureece Rice	6 ft 1 in (1.85 m)	—	Jr	Philadelphia, Pennsylvania
F	41	Peter Laplante	6 ft 8 in (2.03 m)	—	Fr	Kiawah Island, South Carolina
F	42	Dokun Akingbade	6 ft 9 in (2.06 m)	—	RS Sr	Riverdale, Maryland
F	52	Dominic Green	6 ft 6 in (1.98 m)	—	So	Oakland, California

Head coach

- Karl Hobbs (Connecticut)

Assistant coach(es)

Legend

- (C) Team captain
- (S) Suspended
- (I) Ineligible
- (W) Walk-on
- Injured
- Current redshirt

Roster
Last update: April 29, 2022

== Schedule and results ==
Date time, TV	Rank^{#}	Opponent^{#}	Result	Record	Site city, state
Regular season
November 10, 2006*		at Boston University	W 70–57	1–0	Agganis Arena; Boston, Massachusetts
November 14, 2006*		Dartmouth	W 94–49	2–0	Charles E. Smith Center; Washington, D.C.
November 17, 2006*		Longwood	W 74–60	3–0	Charles E. Smith Center; Washington, D.C.
November 21, 2006*		at Kennesaw State	W 69–52	4–0	KSU Convocation Center; Kennesaw, GA
November 26, 2006*		at Providence	L 67–86	4–1	Dunkin' Donuts Center; Providence, RI
December 3, 2006*		vs. Virginia Tech; BB&T Classic	W 63–62	5–1	Verizon Center; Washington, D.C.
December 5, 2006*		Maryland Eastern Shore	W 79–56	6–1	Charles E. Smith Center; Washington, D.C.
December 9, 2006*		vs. USC; Wooden Classic	L 65–74	6–2	Honda Center; Anaheim, CA
December 12, 2006*		UMBC	W 72–51	7–2	Charles E. Smith Center; Washington, D.C.
December 28, 2006*		vs. No. 23 Air Force; Cable Car Classic	L 52–66	7–3	Leavey Center; Santa Clara, CA
December 29, 2006*		vs. Colgate; Cable Car Classic	W 75–42	8–3	Leavey Center; Santa Clara, CA
January 3, 2007		Fordham	W 70–59	9–3 (1–0)	Charles E. Smith Center; Washington, D.C.
January 6, 2007*		Marshall	W 74–65	10–3	Charles E. Smith Center; Washington, D.C.
January 10, 2007		at UMass	L 84–91	10–4 (1–1)	Mullins Center; Amherst, MA
January 13, 2007		St. Bonaventure	W 80–63	11–4 (2–1)	Charles E. Smith Center; Washington, D.C.
January 17, 2007		at Richmond	W 63–58	12–4 (3–1)	Robins Center; Richmond, VA
January 20, 2007		Charlotte	W 76–68	13–4 (4–1)	Charles E. Smith Center; Washington, D.C.
January 24, 2007		Saint Joseph's	W 74–65	14–4 (5–1)	Charles E. Smith Center; Washington, D.C.
January 27, 2007		at Rhode Island	W 82–78	15–4 (6–1)	Ryan Center; Kingston, RI
January 31, 2007		at Dayton	L 69–84	15–5 (6–2)	UD Arena; Dayton, OH
February 3, 2007		at Saint Louis	L 53–63	15–6 (6–3)	Scottrade Center; St. Louis, MO
February 10, 2007		Xavier	L 58–87	15–7 (6–4)	Charles E. Smith Center; Washington, D.C.
February 14, 2007		at Saint Joseph's	L 56–62	15–8 (6–5)	Alumni Memorial Fieldhouse; Philadelphia, PA
February 17, 2007		Temple	W 84–72	16–8 (7–5)	Charles E. Smith Center; Washington, D.C.
February 21, 2007		Richmond	W 68–49	17–8 (8–5)	Charles E. Smith Center; Washington, D.C.
February 24, 2007		at La Salle	W 86–74	18–8 (9–5)	Tom Gola Arena; Philadelphia, PA
March 1, 2007		at Charlotte	W 62–60	19–8 (10–5)	Dale F. Halton Arena; Charlotte, NC
March 3, 2007		Duquesne	W 88–80	20–8 (11–5)	Charles E. Smith Center; Washington, D.C.
Atlantic 10 tournament
March 8, 2007	(3)	vs. (6) Saint Joseph's; Atlantic 10 Quarterfinals	W 58–48	21–8	Boardwalk Hall; Atlantic City, NJ
March 9, 2007	(3)	vs. (7) Saint Louis; Atlantic 10 Semifinals	W 60–40	22–8	Boardwalk Hall; Atlantic City, NJ
March 10, 2007	(3)	vs. (4) Rhode Island; Atlantic 10 Championship	W 78–69	23–8	Boardwalk Hall; Atlantic City, NJ
NCAA tournament
March 15, 2007; 4:55 p.m., CBS	(11 E)	vs. (6 E) Vanderbilt; NCAA First Round	L 44–77	23–9	ARCO Arena (16,338); Sacramento, CA
*Non-conference game. ^{#}Rankings from AP Poll. (#) Tournament seedings in parentheses.
