= 2007 Missouri Valley Conference men's basketball tournament =

- Classification: Division I
- Season: 2006–07
- Teams: 10
- Site: Scottrade Center; St. Louis, Missouri
- Champions: Creighton (10th title)
- Winning coach: Dana Altman (6th title)
- MVP: Nate Funk (Creighton)

2006–07 Missouri Valley Conference men's basketball standings
	Conf.				Overall
Team	W		L	PCT	W		L	PCT
No. 14 Southern Illinois	15	–	3	.833	29	–	7	.806
Creighton †	13	–	5	.722	22	–	11	.667
Missouri State	12	–	6	.667	22	–	11	.667
Bradley	10	–	8	.556	22	–	13	.629
Northern Iowa	9	–	9	.500	18	–	13	.581
Wichita State	8	–	10	.444	17	–	14	.548
Illinois State	6	–	12	.333	15	–	16	.484
Evansville	6	–	12	.333	14	–	17	.452
Drake	6	–	12	.333	17	–	15	.531
Indiana State	5	–	13	.278	13	–	18	.419
† 2007 MVC tournament winner Rankings from AP poll

The 2007 Missouri Valley Conference men's basketball tournament, known for sponsorship reasons as the 2007 State Farm Missouri Valley Conference men's basketball tournament, or informally as Arch Madness 2007, is the championship tournament for men's basketball teams of the Missouri Valley Conference. It was held in St. Louis, Missouri, and Creighton, the champion, received an automatic berth in the 2007 NCAA Men's Division I Basketball Tournament. The tournament was contested by the men's basketball teams of each of the MVC's 10 schools, with seedings based on regular-season conference records. The 2007 edition ran from March 1, until March 4, 2007.

== Seeds ==
All Missouri Valley Conference schools played in the tournament.

Seed	School	Conference (Overall)
1	Southern Illinois	15–3 (27–6)
2	Creighton	13–5 (22–10)
3	Missouri State	12–6 (22–10)
4	Bradley	10–8 (21–12)
5	Northern Iowa	9–9 (18–13)
6	Wichita State	8–10 (17–14)
7	Illinois State	6–12 (15–16)
8	Evansville	6–12 (14–17)
9	Drake	6–12 (17–15)
10	Indiana State	5–13 (13–18)

== Bracket ==
Opening Round; Thursday, March 1
8	Evansville	96^{OT}
9	Drake	101
7	Illinois State	65
10	Indiana State	68

Quarterfinals; Friday, March 2
1	No. 11 Southern Illinois	71
9	Drake	59
4	Bradley	51
5	Northern Iowa	48
2	Creighton	59
10	Indiana State	38
3	Missouri State	67
6	Wichita State	64

Semifinals; Saturday, March 3
1	No. 11 Southern Illinois	53
4	Bradley	51
2	Creighton	75
3	Missouri State	58

Final; Sunday, March 4
1	No. 11 Southern Illinois	61
2	Creighton	67
