= 2006–07 Southern Illinois Salukis men's basketball team =

American college basketball season

2006–07 Southern Illinois Salukis men's basketball

Missouri Valley regular season champion

NCAA Tournament, Sweet Sixteen
- Conference: Missouri Valley Conference

Ranking
- Coaches: No. 11
- AP: No. 14
- Record: 29–7 (15–3 MVC)
- Head coach: Chris Lowery
- Home arena: SIU Arena

2006–07 Missouri Valley Conference men's basketball standings
	Conf.				Overall
Team	W		L	PCT	W		L	PCT
No. 14 Southern Illinois	15	–	3	.833	29	–	7	.806
Creighton †	13	–	5	.722	22	–	11	.667
Missouri State	12	–	6	.667	22	–	11	.667
Bradley	10	–	8	.556	22	–	13	.629
Northern Iowa	9	–	9	.500	18	–	13	.581
Wichita State	8	–	10	.444	17	–	14	.548
Illinois State	6	–	12	.333	15	–	16	.484
Evansville	6	–	12	.333	14	–	17	.452
Drake	6	–	12	.333	17	–	15	.531
Indiana State	5	–	13	.278	13	–	18	.419
† 2007 MVC tournament winner Rankings from AP poll

In the 2006–07 season, the Southern Illinois Salukis men's basketball team played in the Missouri Valley Conference and took part in the Missouri Valley tournament (reaching the West Regional semifinal) and the NCAA tournament. The team won 29 of its matches and lost 7.

== Recruiting ==
College recruiting information
Name	Hometown	School	Height	Weight	Commit date
Kobby Acquah; C	Ghana	Clark Atlanta University	7 ft 1 in (2.16 m)	225 lb (102 kg)	Aug 23, 2006
Kobby Acquah; C	Recruit ratings: Scout: Rivals: (N/A)				
Josh Bone; SG	Brentwood, TN	Brentwood Academy	6 ft 2 in (1.88 m)	170 lb (77 kg)	Oct 31, 2005
Josh Bone; SG	Recruit ratings: Scout: Rivals: (N/A)				
Tyrone Green; PG	Harrisburg, IL	Southeastern Illinois C.C.	6 ft 3 in (1.91 m)	205 lb (93 kg)	Mar 27, 2006
Tyrone Green; PG	Recruit ratings: Scout: Rivals: (N/A)				
Overall recruit ranking: Scout: NR Rivals: NR ESPN: N/A
Note: In many cases, Scout, Rivals, 247Sports, On3, and ESPN may conflict in their listings of height and weight.; In these cases, the average was taken. ESPN grades are on a 100-point scale.; Sources: "Southern Illinois 2006 Basketball Commitments". Rivals.; "2006 Southern Illinois Basketball Commits". Scout.; "ESPN". ESPN.; "Scout.com Team Recruiting Rankings". Scout.; "2006 Team Ranking". Rivals.

== Roster ==
Name	#	Position	Height	Weight	Year	Home town
Kobby Acquah	11	Center	7-1	225	Senior	Ghana
Jordan Armstrong	5	Forward	6–6	220	Freshman	Muncie, IN
Joshua Bone	4	Guard	6–3	190	Freshman	Brentwood, TN
Tony Boyle	35	Forward	6–8	230	Sophomore	De Soto, MO
Wesley Clemmons	24	Guard	6-3	195	Sophomore	Indianapolis, IN
Dion Coopwood	12	Guard	5-11	170	Junior	Calumet City, IL
Christian Cornelius	21	Forward	6–7	205	Freshman	Oak Park, IL
Randal Falker	14	Forward	6–7	230	Junior	Saint Louis, MO
Jamaal Foster	23	Forward	6–10	225	Junior	Columbia, MO
Tyrone Green	22	Guard	6–3	205	Junior	Harrisburg, IL
Bryan Mullins	10	Guard	6–2	190	Sophomore	Downers Grove, IL
Matt Shaw	32	Forward	6–7	225	Junior	Centralia, IL
Jamaal Tatum	3	Guard	6–2	175	Senior	Jefferson City, MO
Tony Young	15	Guard	6–0	190	Junior	Schaumburg, IL

== Schedule ==
Date time, TV	Rank^{#}	Opponent^{#}	Result	Record	Site city, state
Regular season
Nov 10*; 7:05 pm		Washington (MO)	W 59–28	1–0	SIU Arena; Carbondale, Illinois
Nov 19*; 2:05 pm		Murray State	W 62–46	2–0	SIU Arena; Carbondale, Illinois
Nov 23*; 12:00 pm		vs. Arkansas; Old Spice Classic	L 53–61	2–1	HP Field House; Orlando, Florida
Nov 24*; 12:30 pm		vs. Minnesota; Old Spice Classic	W 69–53	3–1	HP Field House; Orlando, Florida
Nov 26*; 1:00 pm		vs. Virginia Tech; Old Spice Classic	W 69–64	4–1	HP Field House; Orlando, Florida
Nov 29*; 7:00 pm		at Louisiana Tech	W 50–36	5–1	Thomas Assembly Center; Ruston, LA
Dec 2*; 2:05 pm		Saint Louis	W 65–56	6–1	SIU Arena; Carbondale, Illinois
Dec 9*; 7:00 pm		at Western Kentucky	W 75–70	7–1	E. A. Diddle Arena; Bowling Green, Kentucky
Dec 17*; 8:00 pm		at Indiana	L 47–57	7–2	Assembly Hall; Bloomington, Indiana
Dec 20*; 7:05 pm		Central Michigan	W 74–61	8–2	SIU Arena; Carbondale, Illinois
Dec 23*; 11:00 am		at Saint Mary's College	W 66–61	9–2	McKeon Pavilion; Moraga, California
Dec 29; 6:05 pm		at Illinois State	W 68–49	10–2 (1–0)	Redbird Arena; Normal, Illinois
Jan 1; 7:05 pm		Wichita State	W 73–68	11–2 (2–0)	SIU Arena; Carbondale, Illinois
Jan 4; 7:05 pm		at Drake	W 59–54	12–2 (3–0)	Knapp Center; Des Moines, Iowa
Jan 6; 12:00 pm		at Northern Iowa	L 61–66	12–3 (3–1)	McLeod Center; Cedar Falls, Iowa
Jan 10; 7:05 pm		at Bradley	L 46–48	12–4 (3–2)	Geno Ford; Peoria, Illinois
Jan 13; 2:05 pm		Missouri State	W 76–56	13–4 (4–2)	SIU Arena; Carbondale, Illinois
Jan 15; 7:05 pm		Drake	W 72–62	14–4 (5–2)	SIU Arena; Carbondale, Illinois
Jan 17; 7:05 pm		at Evansville	L 68–75	14–5 (5–3)	Roberts Stadium; Evansville, Indiana
Jan 20; 7:05 pm		at Creighton	W 58–57	15–5 (6–3)	Qwest Center Omaha; Omaha, Nebraska
Jan 23; 8:05 pm		Northern Illinois	W 56–54	16–5 (7–3)	SIU Arena; Carbondale, Illinois
Jan 27; 2:05 pm		Illinois State	W 73–62	17–5 (8–3)	SIU Arena; Carbondale, Illinois
Jan 31; 7:05 pm		Indiana State	W 61–48	18–5 (9–3)	SIU Arena; Carbondale, Illinois
Feb 3; 1:05 pm		at Wichita State	W 54–46	19–5 (10–3)	Charles Koch Arena; Wichita, Kansas
Feb 7; 7:35 pm	No. 20	Bradley	W 60–50	20–5 (11–3)	SIU Arena; Carbondale, Illinois
Feb 10; 5:05 pm	No. 20	Creighton	W 72–68	21–5 (12–3)	SIU Arena; Carbondale, Illinois
Feb 13; 7:05 pm	No. 15	at Missouri State	W 51–47	22–5 (13–3)	JQH Arena; Springfield, Missouri
Feb 17; 3:00 pm, ESPN	No. 15	at No. 12 Butler	W 68–64	23–5	Bramlage Coliseum; Manhattan, Kansas
Feb 21; 7:05 pm	No. 14	at Indiana State	W 58–50	24–5 (14–3)	Hulman Center; Terre Haute, Indiana
Feb 24; 7:37 pm	No. 14	Evansville	W 76–69	25–5 (15–3)	SIU Arena; Carbondale, Illinois
Missouri Valley Tournament
Mar 2; 12:05 pm	(1) No. 11	vs. (9) Drake; Quarterfinals	W 71–59	26–5	Edward Jones Dome; St. Louis, Missouri
Mar 3; 1:35 pm	(1) No. 11	vs. (4) Bradley; Semifinals	W 53–51	27–5	Edward Jones Dome; St. Louis, Missouri
Mar 4; 1:05 pm, CBS	(1) No. 11	vs. (2) Creighton; Championship	L 61–67	27–6	Edward Jones Dome; St. Louis, Missouri
NCAA Tournament
Mar 16; 9:40 pm, CBS	(4 W) No. 13	vs. (13 W) Holy Cross; First round	W 61–51	28–6	Nationwide Arena; Columbus, Ohio
Mar 18; 1:30 pm, CBS	(4 W) No. 13	vs. (5 W) Virginia Tech; Second Round	W 63–48	29–6	Nationwide Arena; Columbus, Ohio
Mar 22; 6:10 pm, CBS	(4 W) No. 13	vs. (1 W) No. 2 Kansas; Sweet Sixteen	L 58–61	29–7	HP Pavilion; San Jose, California
*Non-conference game. ^{#}Rankings from Coaches' Poll. (#) Tournament seedings in parentheses. W=West Region. All times are in Central Time.
