= 2006–07 UMass Minutemen basketball team =

American college basketball season

2006–07 UMass Minutemen men's basketball

Atlantic 10 regular season co-champions

NIT, Second Round
- Conference: Atlantic 10 Conference
- Record: 24-9 (13-3 A-10)
- Head coach: Travis Ford (2nd season)
- Assistant coaches: Adam Ginsburg; Tim Maloney; Steve Middleton
- Home arena: William D. Mullins Memorial Center

2006–07 Atlantic 10 men's basketball standings
	Conf.				Overall
Team	W		L	PCT	W		L	PCT
Xavier	13	–	3	.813	25	–	9	.735
UMass	13	–	3	.813	24	–	9	.727
George Washington †	11	–	5	.688	23	–	9	.719
Fordham	10	–	6	.625	18	–	12	.600
Rhode Island	10	–	6	.625	19	–	14	.576
Saint Joseph's	9	–	7	.563	18	–	14	.563
Dayton	8	–	8	.500	19	–	12	.613
Saint Louis	8	–	8	.500	20	–	13	.606
Charlotte	7	–	9	.438	14	–	16	.467
Temple	6	–	10	.375	12	–	18	.400
Duquesne	6	–	10	.375	10	–	19	.345
Richmond	4	–	12	.250	8	–	22	.267
St. Bonaventure	4	–	12	.250	7	–	22	.241
La Salle	3	–	13	.188	10	–	20	.333
† 2007 Atlantic 10 Tournament winner Rankings from AP Poll

The 2006–07 UMass Minutemen basketball team represented the University of Massachusetts Amherst during the 2006–07 NCAA Division I men's basketball season. The Minutemen, led by second year head coach Travis Ford, played their home games at William D. Mullins Memorial Center and are members of the Atlantic 10 Conference. They finished the season 24–9, 13–3 in A-10 play to finish for a first place tie with Xavier.

== Roster ==
Number	Name	Position	Height	Weight	Year	Hometown
1	Rashaun Freeman	Center/Forward	6–9	255	Senior	Schenectady, New York
2	Brandon Thomas	Guard/Forward	6–6	200	Senior	San Antonio, Texas
3	Gary Forbes	Forward/Guard	6–7	220	RS Junior	Brooklyn, New York
4	Mike Sinn	Guard	5-10	165	Freshman	Jericho, New York
5	Ricky Harris	Guard	6–2	175	Freshman	Baltimore, Maryland
10	Tiki Mayben	Guard	6–2	180	Freshman	Troy, New York
12	Matt Pennie	Forward	6–7	210	Senior	Hanson, Massachusetts
13	Stéphane Lasme	Forward	6–8	215	Senior	Libreville, Gabon
14	Chris Lowe	Guard	6–0	160	Sophomore	Mount Vernon, New York
20	Dante Milligan	Forward	6–9	215	RS Junior	New York City
22	Etienne Brower	Forward	6–7	215	RS Junior	West Hempstead, New York
24	Tony Gaffney	Forward	6–8	195	Junior	Berkley, Massachusetts
31	Luke Bonner	Center	7-1	245	RS Sophomore	Concord, New Hampshire
34	James Life	Guard	6–6	190	Senior	Fort Myers, Florida
40	Nana Ampim	Guard	6–1	195	Junior	London

== Schedule ==
Date time, TV	Rank^{#}	Opponent^{#}	Result	Record	Site (attendance) city, state
Exhibition
8/18/2006*; 6:00 pm		Explorers (Bahamas Exhibition)	W 128-59		D. W. Davis Gym (????); Nassau, Bahamas
8/19/2006*; 6:00 pm		Crimestoppers (Bahamas Exhibition)	W 135-77		D. W. Davis Gym (????); Nassau, Bahamas
8/21/2006*; 9:00 pm		Rockets (Bahamas Exhibition)	W 126-59		Loyola Hall (????); Nassau, Bahamas
8/21/2006*; 9:00 pm		Giants (Bahamas Exhibition)	W 103-42		Loyola Hall (????); Nassau, Bahamas
8/22/2006*; 8:00 pm		Rattlers (Bahamas Exhibition)	W 138-86		Loyola Hall (????); Nassau, Bahamas
11/04/2006*; 7:30 pm		Bridgeport	W 88-61		Mullins Center (3,003); Amherst, Massachusetts
02/02/2007; 4:30 pm		Atlantic 10 Shootout			Curry Hicks Cage (????); Amherst, Massachusetts
Regular Season
11/11/2006*; 5:00 pm		Dartmouth	W 98-61	1–0	Mullins Center (????); Amherst, Massachusetts
11/17/2007*; 2:00 pm		vs. Oakland; Colonial Classic	W 65-56	2–0	Petersen Events Center (????); Pittsburgh, Pennsylvania
11/18/2006*; 5:00 pm		at Pittsburgh; Colonial Classic	L 68-85	2–1	Petersen Events Center (10,209); Pittsburgh, Pennsylvania
11/19/2006*; 2:00 pm		vs. Northeastern; Colonial Classic	W 79–56	3–1	Petersen Events Center (300); Pittsburgh, Pennsylvania
11/22/2006*; 7:00 pm		St. Francis (NY)	W 63-49	4–1	Mullins Center (5,528); Amherst, Massachusetts
11/25/2006*; 7:30 pm		at Jacksonville State	W 100-69	5–1	Pete Mathews Coliseum (3,488); Jacksonville, Alabama
11/28/2006*; 7:00 pm		at Savannah State	W 72-49	6-1	Tiger Arena (3,727); Savannah, Georgia
12/02/2006*; 7:30 pm		Boston College	L 73-84	6-2	Mullins Center (8,493); Amherst, Massachusetts
12/06/2006*; 8:00 pm		at Boston University	W 56-54	7-2	Agganis Arena (3,101); Boston, Massachusetts
12/09/2006*; 8:00 pm		at Central Connecticut State	W 79-66	8-2	Mohegan Sun Arena (3,064); Uncasville, Connecticut
12/13/2006*; 7:00 pm		at Louisville; Billy Minardi Classic	W 72-68	9-2	Freedom Hall (18,464); Louisville, Kentucky
12/22/2006*; 7:00 pm		at Kentucky	L 68-82	9-3	Rupp Arena (24,307); Lexington, Kentucky
12/28/2006*; 7:00 pm		Yale	W 78-69	10-3	Mullins Center (4,212); Amherst, Massachusetts
1/02/2007*; 7:00 pm		Miami (FL)	L 71-72	10-4	Mullins Center (3,982); Amherst, Massachusetts
1/06/2007; 4:00 pm		at La Salle	W 79-71	11-4 (1-0)	Tom Gola Arena (1,430); Philadelphia, Pennsylvania
1/10/2007; 7:00 pm		George Washington	W 91-84	12-4 (2-0)	Mullins Center (4,106); Amherst, Massachusetts
01/13/2007; 12:00 pm		Temple	W 88-77	13-4 (3–0)	Mullins Center (6,212); Amherst, Massachusetts
01/18/2007; 7:00 pm		at Xavier	L 77-83	13-5 (3–1)	Cintas Center (9,901); Cincinnati, Ohio
01/21/2007; 2:00 pm		Duquesne	L 87-101	14-5 (4–1)	Mullins Center (4,648); Amherst, Massachusetts
01/24/2007; 7:00 pm		at Rhode Island	L 72-75	14-6 (4-2)	Ryan Center (7,021); Kingston, Rhode Island
01/28/2007; 1:00 pm		at Charlotte	W 66-61	15-6 (5-2)	Halton Arena (7,679); Charlotte, North Carolina
02/03/2007; 12:00 pm		Richmond	W 72-56	16-6 (6-2)	Mullins Center (5,221); Amherst, Massachusetts
02/08/2007; 8:00 pm		Rhode Island	W 77-55	17-6 (7-2)	Mullins Center (8,358); Amherst, Massachusetts
2/11/2007; 2:00 pm		at Temple	L 89-98	17-7 (7–3)	Liacouras Center (7,136); Philadelphia, Pennsylvania
02/15/2007; 9:00 pm		at Fordham	W 74-59	18-7 (8-3)	Rose Hill Gym (3,200); Bronx, New York
02/18/2007; 2:00 pm		at Dayton	W 77-69	19-7 (9-3)	UD Arena (13,213); Dayton, Ohio
02/21/2007; 7:00 pm		St. Bonaventure	W 83-44	20-7 (10-3)	Mullins Center (6,203); Amherst, Massachusetts
02/24/2007; 7:00 pm		St. Louis	W 53-50	21-7 (11-3)	Mullins Center (9,088); Amherst, Massachusetts
02/28/2007; 7:00 pm		La Salle	W 102-63	22-7 (12-3)	Mullins Center (6,025); Amherst, Massachusetts
03/03/2007; 4:00 pm		at St. Joseph's	W 71-67	23-7 (13-3)	Alumni Memorial Fieldhouse (3,200); Philadelphia, Pennsylvania
2007 Atlantic 10 men's basketball tournament
03/08/2007; 6:30 pm		vs. St. Louis; 1st Round	L 71-74 ^{OT}	23-8	Boardwalk Hall (????); Atlantic City, New Jersey
2007 NIT
03/13/2007*; 6:00 pm, ESPN		Alabama; First Round	W 89-87 ^{OT}	24–8	Mullins Center (????); Amherst, Massachusetts
03/15/2007*; 9:00 pm, ESPNU		at West Virginia; Second Round	L 77-90	24-9	WVU Coliseum (7,146); Morgantown, West Virginia
*Non-conference game. ^{#}Rankings from AP Poll. (#) Tournament seedings in parentheses. All times are in Eastern Time.
