= 2006–07 Xavier Musketeers men's basketball team =

American college basketball season

2006–07 Xavier Musketeers men's basketball

Atlantic 10 regular season co-champions

NCAA tournament, second round
- Conference: Atlantic 10 Conference
- Record: 25–9 (13–3 A-10)
- Head coach: Sean Miller (3rd season)
- Assistant coaches: Chris Mack; James Whitford; Emanuel Richardson
- Home arena: Cintas Center

2006–07 Atlantic 10 men's basketball standings
	Conf.				Overall
Team	W		L	PCT	W		L	PCT
Xavier	13	–	3	.813	25	–	9	.735
UMass	13	–	3	.813	24	–	9	.727
George Washington †	11	–	5	.688	23	–	9	.719
Fordham	10	–	6	.625	18	–	12	.600
Rhode Island	10	–	6	.625	19	–	14	.576
Saint Joseph's	9	–	7	.563	18	–	14	.563
Dayton	8	–	8	.500	19	–	12	.613
Saint Louis	8	–	8	.500	20	–	13	.606
Charlotte	7	–	9	.438	14	–	16	.467
Temple	6	–	10	.375	12	–	18	.400
Duquesne	6	–	10	.375	10	–	19	.345
Richmond	4	–	12	.250	8	–	22	.267
St. Bonaventure	4	–	12	.250	7	–	22	.241
La Salle	3	–	13	.188	10	–	20	.333
† 2007 Atlantic 10 Tournament winner Rankings from AP Poll

The 2006–07 Xavier Musketeers men's basketball team represented Xavier University in the 2007–08 college basketball season. They were led by head coach Sean Miller in his third season at Xavier. The Musketeers were members of the Atlantic 10 Conference and played their home games at the Cintas Center. Xavier finished the season with a record of 25–9, 13–3 in A-10 play to share the regular season championship. The Musketeers lost in the semifinals of the A-10 tournament to Rhode Island. They received an at-large bid to the NCAA tournament as the No. 9 seed in the South region. The Musketeers defeated BYU to advance to the second round before losing to No. 1 seed Ohio State.

== Roster ==
2006–07 Xavier Musketeers men's basketball team
Players
Coaches

Pos.	#	Name	Height	Weight	Year	Previous school	Hometown
F	1	Josh Duncan	6 ft 9 in (2.06 m)	235 lb (107 kg)	Jr	Moeller HS	Cincinnati, OH
G	2	Adrion Graves	6 ft 4 in (1.93 m)	194 lb (88 kg)	Fr	Hughes Center	Cincinnati, OH
F	3	Justin Cage	6 ft 6 in (1.98 m)	225 lb (102 kg)	Sr	Pike HS	Indianapolis, IN
F	5	Derrick Brown	6 ft 8 in (2.03 m)	225 lb (102 kg)	Fr	Chaminade Julienne HS	Dayton, OH
G/F	11	B. J. Raymond	6 ft 6 in (1.98 m)	225 lb (102 kg)	So	St. John's Jesuit HS	Toledo, OH
G	14	Johnny Wolf	6 ft 2 in (1.88 m)	185 lb (84 kg)	So	St. Xavier HS	Cincinnati, OH
F	15	Justin Doellman	6 ft 9 in (2.06 m)	210 lb (95 kg)	Sr	Ryle HS	Union, KY
F	15	Andrew Taylor	6 ft 8 in (2.03 m)	215 lb (98 kg)	Fr	St. John's Jesuit HS	Toledo, OH
G/F	20	C. J. Anderson	6 ft 6 in (1.98 m)	220 lb (100 kg)	So	Winton Woods HS	Cincinnati, OH
G	24	Drew Lavender	5 ft 7 in (1.7 m)	153 lb (69 kg)	Jr	Brookhaven HS	Columbus, OH
F/C	31	Jason Love	6 ft 9 in (2.06 m)	265 lb (120 kg)	Fr	Abington Friends	Philadelphia, PA
F	33	Brandon Cole	6 ft 8 in (2.03 m)	230 lb (104 kg)	Sr	Rich South HS	Richton Park, IL
G	34	Stanley Burrell	6 ft 3 in (1.91 m)	210 lb (95 kg)	Jr	Ben Davis HS; Hargrave Military Academy	Indianapolis, IN
C	41	Adam Simons	7 ft 0 in (2.13 m)	248 lb (112 kg)	Sr	Walter M. Williams HS	Burlington, NC
F	45	Kevin Waymire	6 ft 7 in (2.01 m)	220 lb (100 kg)	Sr	Roger Bacon HS	Cincinnati, OH

Head coach

- Sean Miller (Pittsburgh)

Assistant coach(es)

- Chris Mack (Xavier)
- James Whitford (Wisconsin)
- Emanuel Richardson

Legend

- (C) Team captain
- (S) Suspended
- (I) Ineligible
- (W) Walk-on
- Injured
- Current redshirt

Roster

== Schedule and results ==
Date time, TV	Rank^{#}	Opponent^{#}	Result	Record	Site (attendance) city, state
Exhibitions
November 1, 2006*; 7:00 p.m.		Tusculum	W 82–58		Cintas Center; Cincinnati, Ohio
November 6, 2006*; 7:00 p.m.		Northern Kentucky	W 58–44		Cintas Center; Cincinnati, Ohio
Non-conference regular season
November 11, 2006*; 7:00 p.m.		Coastal Carolina	W 79–46	1–0	Cintas Center; Cincinnati, Ohio
November 17, 2006*; 6:00 p.m.		vs. VCU; Paradise Jam tournament	W 70–67	2–0	Sports and Fitness Center; Saint Thomas, U.S. Virgin Islands
November 19, 2006*; 8:30 p.m.		vs. Villanova; Paradise Jam Tournament	W 71–66	3–0	Sports and Fitness Center; Saint Thomas, U.S. Virgin Islands
November 20, 2006*; 8:30 p.m.		vs. No. 8 Alabama; Paradise Jam Tournament	L 56–63	3–1	Sports and Fitness Center (3,032); Saint Thomas, U.S. Virgin Islands
November 25, 2006*; 12:00 p.m.		American	W 86–68	4–1	Cintas Center; Cincinnati, Ohio
November 29, 2006*; 7:00 p.m.		Miami (OH)	W 68–53	5–1	Cintas Center; Cincinnati, Ohio
December 2, 2006*; 12:00 p.m.		Western Carolina	W 95–61	6–1	Cintas Center; Cincinnati, Ohio
December 5, 2006*; 7:00 p.m.	No. 24	Detroit	W 88–55	7–1	Cintas Center; Cincinnati, Ohio
December 9, 2006*; 8:00 p.m.	No. 24	at Creighton	L 67–73	7–2	Qwest Center Omaha; Omaha, Nebraska
December 13, 2006*; 7:00 p.m.		at Cincinnati; Crosstown Shootout	L 57–67	7–3	Fifth Third Arena; Cincinnati, Ohio
December 16, 2006*; 6:00 p.m.		Arizona State	W 76–58	8–3	Cintas Center; Cincinnati, Ohio
December 20, 2006*; 7:00 p.m.		Bucknell	L 67–68	8–4	Cintas Center; Cincinnati, Ohio
December 29, 2006*; 9:00 p.m.		Illinois	W 65–59	9–4	U.S. Bank Arena; Cincinnati, Ohio
January 3, 2007*; 7:00 p.m.		Kansas State	W 76–66	10–4	U.S. Bank Arena; Cincinnati, Ohio
A-10 regular season
January 6, 2007; 7:00 p.m.		Temple	W 76–68	11–4 (1–0)	Cintas Center; Cincinnati, Ohio
January 11, 2007; 8:00 p.m.		at Fordham	W 71–56	12–4 (2–0)	Rose Hill Gymnasium; Bronx, New York
January 13, 2007; 9:00 p.m.		at Saint Louis	L 65–76	12–5 (2–1)	Scottrade Center; St. Louis, Missouri
January 18, 2007; 7:00 p.m.		UMass	W 83–77	13–5 (3–1)	Cintas Center; Cincinnati, Ohio
January 21, 2007; 12:00 p.m.		at Saint Joseph's	L 74–82	14–5 (3–2)	Hagan Arena; Philadelphia, Pennsylvania
January 24, 2007; 7:00 p.m.		at St. Bonaventure	W 92–66	15–5 (4–2)	Reilly Center; St. Bonaventure, New York
January 27, 2007; 12:00 p.m.		Dayton	W 83–67	16–5 (5–2)	Cintas Center; Cincinnati, Ohio
January 31, 2007; 7:00 p.m.		at Duquesne	L 91–93	16–6 (5–3)	A.J. Palumbo Center; Pittsburgh, Pennsylvania
February 3, 2007; 4:00 p.m.		Charlotte	W 91–57	17–6 (6–3)	Cintas Center; Cincinnati, Ohio
February 7, 2007; 7:00 p.m.		Saint Louis	W 76–57	18–6 (7–3)	Cintas Center; Cincinnati, Ohio
February 10, 2007; 8:00 p.m.		at George Washington	W 87–58	19–6 (8–3)	Charles E. Smith Center; Washington, D.C.
February 17, 2007; 6:00 p.m.		Richmond	W 71–50	20–6 (9–3)	Cintas Center; Cincinnati, Ohio
February 21, 2007; 7:00 p.m.		Rhode Island	W 98–72	21–6 (10–3)	Cintas Center; Cincinnati, Ohio
February 24, 2007; 6:00 p.m.		at Dayton	W 75–67	22–6 (11–3)	UD Arena; Dayton, Ohio
February 28, 2007; 7:00 p.m.		Saint Joseph's	W 72–62	23–6 (12–3)	Cintas Center; Cincinnati, Ohio
March 3, 2007; 12:00 p.m.		at La Salle	W 76–65	23–7 (13–3)	Tom Gola Arena; Philadelphia, Pennsylvania
A-10 tournament
March 8, 2007*; 12:00 p.m.	(1)	vs. (8) Dayton; Quarterfinals	W 72–51	24–7	Boardwalk Hall; Atlantic City, New Jersey
March 9, 2007*; 6:30 p.m.	(1)	vs. (4) Rhode Island; Semifinals	L 71–79	24–8	Boardwalk Hall; Atlantic City, New Jersey
NCAA tournament
March 15, 2007*; 9:40 p.m.	(9 S)	vs. (8 S) No. 24 BYU; First Round	W 79–77	25–8	Rupp Arena; Lexington, Kentucky
March 17, 2007*; 1:10 p.m.	(9 S)	vs. (1 S) No. 1 Ohio State; Second Round	L 71–78 ^{OT}	25–9	Rupp Arena (20,882); Lexington, Kentucky
*Non-conference game. ^{#}Rankings from AP Poll. (#) Tournament seedings in parentheses. W=West.
