= Edgar Padilla =

Puerto Rican basketball player

Personal information
- Born: 9 May 1975 (age 51) Toa Alta, Puerto Rico
- Listed height: 6 ft 2 in (1.88 m)
- Listed weight: 175 lb (79 kg)

Career information
- High school: Central (Springfield, Massachusetts)
- College: UMass (1993–1997)
- NBA draft: 1997: undrafted
- Position: Guard

Edgar Padilla (born 9 May 1975) is a Puerto Rican basketball player. He competed in the men's tournament at the 1996 Summer Olympics.

Padilla grew up in Santurce, Puerto Rico as a child of two deaf parents. His mother was deafened by meningitis at age 5 and his father was illiterate and did not know Spanish or English. When Padilla was 14, his parents moved the family to Springfield, Massachusetts. Padilla played high school basketball at Springfield Central High School with Travis Best. They led the school to an undefeated record and state championship. After high school, he played with his older brother, Giddel, on the very successful UMass Minutemen basketball teams of the 1990s. Padilla set career and single-season records in steals for UMass.

After college, he played professionally in Puerto Rico and became a real estate agent. As of 2021, he was the executive director of a hospital in Carolina, Puerto Rico.
