= 2007 Atlantic 10 men's basketball tournament =

- Classification: Division I
- Season: 2006–07
- Teams: 12
- Site: Boardwalk Hall; Atlantic City, New Jersey
- Champions: George Washington (2nd title)
- Winning coach: Karl Hobbs (2nd title)
- MVP: Maureece Rice (George Washington)

2006–07 Atlantic 10 men's basketball standings
	Conf.				Overall
Team	W		L	PCT	W		L	PCT
Xavier	13	–	3	.813	25	–	9	.735
UMass	13	–	3	.813	24	–	9	.727
George Washington †	11	–	5	.688	23	–	9	.719
Fordham	10	–	6	.625	18	–	12	.600
Rhode Island	10	–	6	.625	19	–	14	.576
Saint Joseph's	9	–	7	.563	18	–	14	.563
Dayton	8	–	8	.500	19	–	12	.613
Saint Louis	8	–	8	.500	20	–	13	.606
Charlotte	7	–	9	.438	14	–	16	.467
Temple	6	–	10	.375	12	–	18	.400
Duquesne	6	–	10	.375	10	–	19	.345
Richmond	4	–	12	.250	8	–	22	.267
St. Bonaventure	4	–	12	.250	7	–	22	.241
La Salle	3	–	13	.188	10	–	20	.333
† 2007 Atlantic 10 Tournament winner Rankings from AP Poll

The 2007 Atlantic 10 men's basketball tournament was played from March 7 to March 10, 2007, at Boardwalk Hall in Atlantic City, New Jersey. The winner was named champion of the Atlantic 10 Conference and received an automatic bid to the 2007 NCAA Men's Division I Basketball Tournament. George Washington University won the tournament. Maureece Rice, a guard on George Washington, was named Most Outstanding Player of the tournament. The top four teams in the conference received first-round byes, while La Salle University and St. Bonaventure University were left out of the tournament because they did not finish in the top twelve of the conference.

== Bracket ==
First round Wednesday, March 7
8	Dayton	81
9	Charlotte	63
5	Fordham	63
12	Richmond	61
7	Saint Louis	78
10	Duquesne	77
6	Saint Joseph's	66
11	Temple	62

Quarterfinals; Thursday, March 8
1	Xavier	72
8	Dayton	51
4	Rhode Island	73
5	Fordham	69
2	UMass	71^{OT}
7	Saint Louis	74
3	George Washington	58
6	Saint Joseph's	48

Semifinals; Friday, March 9
1	Xavier	71
4	Rhode Island	79
7	Saint Louis	40
3	George Washington	60

Final; Saturday, March 10
4	Rhode Island	69
3	George Washington	78

All games played at Boardwalk Hall, Atlantic City, NJ
