= Chaz Williams =

American professional basketball player (born 1991)

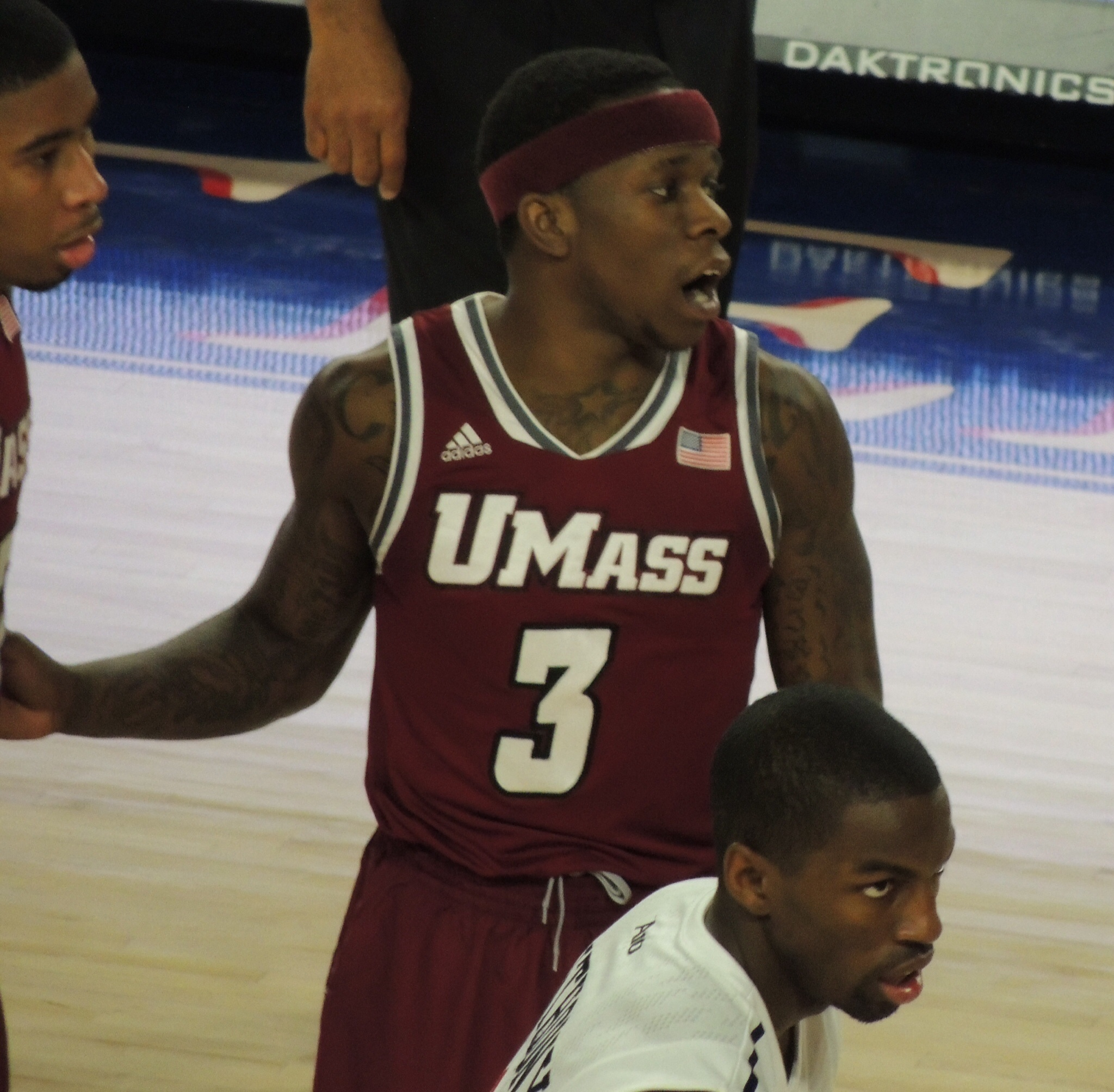

Personal information
- Born: April 6, 1991 (age 35)
- Listed height: 5 ft 9 in (1.75 m)
- Listed weight: 175 lb (79 kg)

Career information
- High school: Bishop Ford (Brooklyn, New York)
- College: Hofstra (2009–2010); UMass (2011–2014)
- NBA draft: 2014: undrafted
- Playing career: 2014–2024
- Position: Point guard

Career history
- 2014: Eskişehir Basket
- 2015: Maine Red Claws
- 2015: Delaware 87ers
- 2016: Geneva Lions
- 2017: Korihait
- 2018: Þór Þorlákshöfn
- 2019: Wilki Morskie Szczecin
- 2019–2020: Njarðvík
- 2020–2021: Pelister
- 2021–2022: Kozuv
- 2022–2023: Aix Maurienne Savoie Basket
- 2023: Club Ourense Baloncesto
- 2023–2024: Njarðvík

Career highlights
- Úrvalsdeild karla assist leader (2024); 3× First-team All-Atlantic 10 (2012–2014); CAA All-Freshman team (2010)

Chaz Calvaron Williams (born April 6, 1991) is an American former professional basketball player. He played college basketball for University of Massachusetts (UMass) and was considered one of the top point guards in the nation for the 2013–14 season.

== College career ==
Williams was a two-time conference player of the year at Bishop Ford High School in Brooklyn, New York. He committed to nearby Hofstra University and moved quickly into the starting lineup. He averaged 9.8 points and 4.2 assists per game and was named to the Colonial Athletic Association All-Freshman team. Following an offseason which saw head coach Tom Pecora leave Hofstra, Williams transferred to UMass.

After sitting out the 2010–11 season as a transfer, Williams led the Minutemen to a 25 win season in 2011–12. He averaged 16.9 points, 6.2 assists, 2.2 steals and 4.4 rebounds per game and was named first team All-Atlantic 10 Conference. As a junior, he repeated on the All-Atlantic 10 team after averaging 15.5 and 7.3 assists per game. However, UMass failed to make the NCAA Tournament for the second straight year. Throughout his UMass career, Williams helped the Minutemen defeat some national ranked teams. This included beating VCU, Dayton, and George Washington.

In the offseason, Williams considered declaring for the 2013 NBA draft. After reviewing information gathered by his coach Derek Kellogg indicating he would likely be a second round pick, he decided to return for his final season and try to make the NCAA Tournament for the first time.

At the beginning of his senior season, Williams was named to the watch lists for the Naismith Player of the Year Award, the Bob Cousy Award for best point guard in the nation and was a preseason All-Atlantic 10 pick. On February 13, 2014, he was named one of the 30 finalists for Naismith College Player of the Year. He led UMass to a #6 seed in the 2014 NCAA Tournament and is ranked 23rd all-time in career assists in NCAA history.

== Professional career ==
Following graduation, Williams went undrafted in the 2014 NBA draft. On August 9, 2014, he signed with Olin Edirne of the Turkish Basketball League. He parted ways with Olin on November 14, 2014, after appearing in just five games.

On February 20, 2015, he was acquired by the Maine Red Claws of the NBA Development League. On March 8, he was waived by the Red Claws after appearing in just three games. On March 20 he was acquired by the Delaware 87ers.

On July 2, 2017, he signed with Korihait of the Finnish Korisliiga. He left the club on November 23, 2017. In 11 games, Williams averaged 12.6 points and 3.8 assists per game.

On January 24, 2018, Williams signed with Þór Þorlákshöfn of the Icelandic Úrvalsdeild karla. In 8 games he averaged 15.8 points, 4.8 assists and 2.9 steals per game. In February 2019, Williams signed with Wilki Morskie Szczecin of the Polish Basketball League.

On November 6, 2019, Williams returned to Iceland and signed with Njarðvík where he met his old coach from Þór Þorlákshöfn, Einar Árni Jóhannsson. For the first four games, he came off the bench and split his playing time with fellow American Wayne Martin Jr. Due to his performance, Njarðvík allowed Martin to sign with Jämtland Basket in Sweden and moved Williams to the starting lineup. On January 16, 2020, he scored a season high 36 point against Reykjanesbær rivals Keflavík. Williams averaged 20 points, 4.9 rebounds, 7.5 assists, and 2.3 steals per game. On August 22, he signed with Pelister of the Macedonian First League. Williams averaged 19.4 points, 7.8 assists, 4.6 rebounds, and 1.8 steals per game. On January 6, 2022, he signed with AMSB of the LNB Pro B.

In May 2023, Williams returned to Iceland and signed back with Njarðvík.
