= Chris Lowe (basketball) =

American basketball player (born 1987)

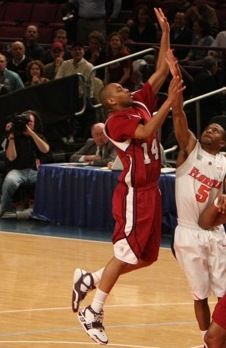

St. Bonaventure Bonnies
- Position: Assistant coach
- League: Atlantic 10

Personal information
- Born: July 17, 1987 (age 39) Mount Vernon, New York, U.S.
- Listed height: 6 ft 0 in (1.83 m)
- Listed weight: 183 lb (83 kg)

Career information
- High school: Mount Vernon (Mount Vernon, New York)
- College: UMass (2005–2009)
- NBA draft: 2009: undrafted
- Playing career: 2009–2018
- Coaching career: 2018–present

Career history

Playing
- 2009–2010: Springfield Armor
- 2010: Maine Red Claws
- 2010–2011: Naglis-Adakris
- 2011: Kėdainiai Triobet
- 2011: Neptūnas
- 2012–2013: MBK Rieker Komárno
- 2013–2014: SKP Banská Bystrica
- 2014–2015: BSC Raiffeisen Panthers Fürstenfeld
- 2015–2016: Xion Dukes Klosterneuburg

Coaching
- 2018-2020: Saint Louis (graduate assistant)
- 2020-2021: UTRGV (assistant)
- 2021-present: St. Bonaventure (assistant)

Career highlights
- LKL All-Star (2011)

Christopher Charles Lowe Jr. (born July 17, 1987) is an American basketball coach and former player who is currently an assistant coach for the St. Bonaventure Bonnies. He played college basketball for the UMass Minutemen.

== High school ==
Chris Lowe attended Mount Vernon High School in New York, the same school that produced Ben Gordon and Gus "The Wizard" Williams. As a senior, averaged 12.9 points and 6.5 assists and 4.5 steals per game. During the Class AA New York State Public Title in 2004 with a 27–3 record, in a championship game, then junior Lowe held future NBA guard Sebastian Telfair to a season-low 14 points in a 66–52 victory.

== College ==
Chris Lowe was the starting point guard for the UMass Minutemen. He led the Atlantic 10 in assists as a freshman in 2005–06, and earned a spot on the league's Rookie Team. As a junior, Lowe averaged 11.8 points and 6.3 assists a game. The 6.3 assists per game also led the A-10. As a senior, he was named a Preseason Atlantic 10 First Team Guard and Preseason All-Defensive Team. He started all of the team's 30 games during his senior season, and finished the year with an average of 12.4 points and 6.4 assists per game. Also named A-10's best passer-by The Sporting News.

Lowe left UMass as the school's all-time leader in assists, with 678 over his career, breaking Carl Smith's prior mark of 633. He also scored 1,152 points for the school in his four seasons.

On March 5, 2008, Lowe had the sixth triple-double in UMass history (his first) with 14 points, 13 assists and 10 rebounds, in a 100–63 win over La Salle University.

Lowe graduated from UMass in May 2009.

== Professional ==
Lowe joined the Springfield Armor in the NBA's Developmental League, on December 11, 2009. Ironically, he replaced Craig Austrie on the roster. Lowe was recruited to UMass to replace Austrie, who had committed to play for UMass but then changed to UConn. The Armor released Lowe after 10 games with the club, during which he averaged 5.0 points and 2.4 assists per game. Lowe was then signed by the D-League's Maine Red Claws, and played in 9 games for the club, averaging 2.7 points and 2.3 assists. He was waived by Maine on January 31, 2010.

In November 2010, Lowe began playing in Lithuania for the Baltic Basketball League club Naglis-Adakris Palangos (Challenge Cup Group A).

In July 2014, he signed with BSC Raiffeisen Panthers Fürstenfeld of Austria. In July 2015, he signed with Xion Dukes Klosterneuburg, also from Austria.

== Coaching ==
Lowe served a two-year stint as a Graduate Student Manager on the Saint Louis University men's basketball staff from 2018 to 2020.

Lowe most recently spent the past year on staff at the University of Texas Rio Grande Valley (UTRGV), serving as special assistant to the head coach.

Lowe later joined the St. Bonaventure University men's basketball coaching staff as an Assistant Head Coach in August 2021 and now enters his fourth season with the Bonnies during 2024–25 season.
