= Coastal Carolina Chanticleers men's basketball statistical leaders =

The Coastal Carolina Chanticleers men's basketball statistical leaders are individual statistical leaders of the Coastal Carolina Chanticleers men's basketball program in various categories, including points, rebounds, assists, steals, and blocks. Within those areas, the lists identify single-game, single-season, and career leaders. The Chanticleers represent Coastal Carolina University in the NCAA's Sun Belt Conference.

Coastal Carolina began competing in intercollegiate basketball in 1974. The NCAA did not officially record assists as a stat until the 1983–84 season, and blocks and steals until the 1985–86 season, but Cleveland State's record books includes players in these stats before these seasons. These lists are updated through the end of the 2020–21 season.

== Scoring ==
Career
Rk	Player	Points	Seasons
1	Tony Dunkin	2,151	1989–90 1990–91 1991–92 1992–93
2	Jack Leasure	1,893	2004–05 2005–06 2006–07 2007–08
3	Elijah Wilson	1,885	2013–14 2014–15 2015–16 2016–17
4	Tony Whittington	1,631	1979–80 1980–81 1981–82 1982–83
5	KeKe Hicks	1,622	1992–93 1993–94 1994–95
6	Derek Wilson	1,492	1985–86 1986–87 1987–88 1988–89
7	Anthony Raffa	1,470	2010–11 2011–12 2012–13
8	Torrey Butler	1,467	1998–99 1999–00 2000–01 2002–03
9	William Calvin	1,465	1984–85 1985–86 1986–87 1987–88
10	Joseph Harris	1,444	2005–06 2006–07 2007–08 2008–09 2009–10

Season
Rk	Player	Points	Season
1	Howard White	770	1975–76
2	Tony Dunkin	759	1992–93
3	Zac Cuthbertson	618	2018–19
4	KeKe Hicks	582	1993–94
5	Forrest Junck	576	1977–78
6	Manuel Jessup	571	1977–78
7	Joshua Beadle	568	2025–26
8	Jaylen Shaw	559	2016–17
9	DeVante' Jones	557	2019–20
10	Anthony Raffa	554	2012–13

Single game
Rk	Player	Points	Season	Opponent
1	Howard White	52	1974–75	College of Charleston
2	Tony Dunkin	43	1992–93	UNC Asheville
	Tony Whittington	43	1981–82	Allen
4	Jeff Roberts	42	1981–82	Erskine
5	KeKe Hicks	40	1994–95	Georgia Tech
6	Pele Paelay	38	2004–05	VMI
	Mohammed Acha	38	1992–93	Radford
8	KeKe Hicks	36	1994–95	UMBC
9	DeVante' Jones	35	2020–21	Alice Lloyd College
	KeKe Hicks	35	1994–95	Winthrop

== Rebounds ==
Career
Rk	Player	Rebounds	Seasons
1	Joseph Harris	1,152	2005–06 2006–07 2007–08 2008–09 2009–10
2	William Calvin	888	1984–85 1985–86 1986–87 1987–88
3	Essam Mostafa	802	2020–21 2021–22 2022–23
4	Badou Diagne	789	2012–13 2013–14 2014–15 2015–16
5	Tony Whittington	763	1979–80 1980–81 1981–82 1982–83
6	Tony Dunkin	725	1989–90 1990–91 1991–92 1992–93
7	Derek Wilson	712	1985–86 1986–87 1987–88 1988–89
8	Maurice Ingram	675	1994–95 1995–96 1996–97
9	Sam McLaurin	647	2008–09 2009–10 2010–11 2011–12
10	Moses Sonko	580	2003–04 2004–05 2005–06 2006–07

Season
Rk	Player	Rebounds	Season
1	Forrest Junck	356	1978–79
2	Joseph Harris	352	2008–09
3	Joseph Harris	336	2009–10
4	Ginika Ojiako	319	2023–24
5	Essam Mostafa	311	2021–22
6	Demario Beck	307	2016–17
7	Zac Cuthbertson	277	2018–19
8	Jim Cabe	272	1976–77
9	Mohammed Acha	265	1992–93
10	William Calvin	263	1986–87

Single game
Rk	Player	Rebounds	Season	Opponent
1	Joseph Harris	22	2008–09	VMI
	Moses Sonko	22	2006–07	VMI
3	William Calvin	21	1987–88	Limestone
4	Maurice Ingram	20	1994–95	UMBC
5	Joseph Harris	19	2009–10	Charleston Southern
	William Calvin	19	1987–88	Coker
	Richard Scantleberry	19	1987–88	Winthrop
8	Badou Diagne	18	2013–14	Presbyterian
	Maurice Ingram	18	1994–95	Liberty
	Maurice Ingram	18	1994–95	Radford
	Maurice Ingram	18	1994–95	UNC Greensboro

== Assists ==
Career
Rk	Player	Assists	Seasons
1	Robert Dowdell	561	1987–88 1988–89 1989–90 1990–91
2	Kierre Greenwood	481	2009–10 2010–11 2011–12 2012–13
3	Ebrima Dibba	468	2018–19 2019–20 2020–21 2021–22
4	Dwight Lighty	460	1977–78 1978–79 1979–80
5	Jaylen Shaw	449	2015–16 2016–17 2017–18
6	Robert Smith	444	1976–77 1977–78
7	Alvin Green	411	2000–01 2001–02 2002–03 2003–04 2004–05
8	Greg Moody	376	1984–85 1985–86 1986–87 1987–88
9	Jack Leasure	353	2004–05 2005–06 2006–07 2007–08
10	Greg Smith	350	1994–95 1995–96 1996–97 1997–98

Season
Rk	Player	Assists	Season
1	Robert Smith	241	1977–78
2	Dwight Lighty	238	1978–79
3	Dwight Lighty	211	1979–80
4	Robert Smith	203	1976–77
5	Robert Dowdell	201	1989–90
6	DeVante' Jones	183	2019–20
7	J.J. Foster	178	1991–92
8	Ebrima Dibba	173	2021–22
9	Jaylen Shaw	172	2017–18
10	Robert Dowdell	167	1988–89

Single game
Rk	Player	Assists	Season	Opponent
1	Dwight Lighty	16	1978–79	Wesleyan
2	Robert Dowdell	14	1989–90	The Citadel
	Henry Abraham	14	2022–23	Methodist
4	Robert Dowdell	13	1989–90	Coll. of Charleston
5	Greg Smith	12	1994–95	Winthrop
	Ebrima Dibba	12	2021–22	UL Monroe
7	Antonio Daye	11	2022–23	South Alabama
	Ebrima Dibba	11	2018–19	South Alabama
	Joey Hart	11	1992–93	Radford
	Robert Dowdell	11	1990–91	UNC Asheville
	Robert Dowdell	11	1989–90	South Alabama
	Robert Dowdell	11	1989–90	Campbell
	Greg Moody	11	1987–88	Augusta

== Steals ==
Career
Rk	Player	Steals	Seasons
1	Robert Dowdell	239	1987–88 1988–89 1989–90 1990–91
2	Joseph Harris	205	2005–06 2006–07 2007–08 2008–09 2009–10
3	Tony Whittington	179	1979–80 1980–81 1981–82 1982–83
4	Kierre Greenwood	178	2009–10 2010–11 2011–12 2012–13
	Howard White	178	1974–75 1975–76
6	Warren Gillis	164	2011–12 2012–13 2013–14 2014–15
7	Brian Penny	158	1987–88 1988–89 1989–90 1990–91
	DeVante' Jones	158	2018–19 2019–20 2020–21
9	Alvin Green	155	2000–01 2001–02 2002–03 2003–04 2004–05
10	Greg Moody	153	1984–85 1985–86 1986–87 1987–88

Season
Rk	Player	Steals	Season
1	Howard White	118	1975–76
2	Robert Dowdell	109	1989–90
3	Manuel Jessup	78	1976–77
4	Robert Smith	76	1977–78
5	Robert Dowdell	73	1990–91
	DeVante' Jones	73	2020–21
7	Pele Paelay	70	2004–05
8	J.J. Foster	69	1991–92
	Manuel Jessup	69	1977–78
	Mohammed Acha	69	1992–93

== Blocks ==
Career
Rk	Player	Blocks	Seasons
1	Sam McLaurin	155	2008–09 2009–10 2010–11 2011–12
2	Joseph Harris	142	2005–06 2006–07 2007–08 2008–09 2009–10
3	DuWayne Cheatam	112	1987–88 1988–89 1989–90 1990–91
4	Badou Diagne	99	2012–13 2013–14 2014–15 2015–16
5	Mohammed Acha	89	1992–93 1993–94
6	Tony Dunkin	87	1989–90 1990–91 1991–92 1992–93
7	Essam Mostafa	77	2020–21 2021–22 2022–23
8	Derek Wilson	74	1985–86 1986–87 1987–88 1988–89
9	Chad Gray	69	2009–10 2010–11
10	Jon Pack	67	2008–09 2009–10 2010–11 2011–12
	Jeff Roberts	67	1981–82 1982–83

Season
Rk	Player	Blocks	Season
1	Sam McLaurin	60	2010–11
2	Sam McLaurin	57	2009–10
3	Nadjrick Peat	54	2025–26
4	Mohammed Acha	51	1992–93
5	Bob Livingston	49	1976–77
6	DuWayne Cheatam	47	1989–90
7	Chad Gray	42	2010–11
8	Jeff Roberts	39	1982–83
	Joseph Harris	39	2006–07
10	Mohammed Acha	38	1993–94
