= Torrey Butler =

American expatriate professional basketball player

Personal information
- Born: October 25, 1980 (age 46) Baltimore, Maryland, U.S.
- Listed height: 6 ft 3 in (1.91 m)
- Listed weight: 205 lb (93 kg)

Career information
- High school: Mount Saint Joseph (Baltimore, Maryland)
- College: Coastal Carolina (1999–2003)
- NBA draft: 2003: undrafted
- Playing career: 2003–2004
- Position: Small forward

Career history
- ?: UCC Demons
- ?: Gmunden

Career highlights
- 2× Big South Player of the Year (2001, 2003)

Torrey Butler (born October 25, 1980) is an American expatriate professional basketball player. He has played in Ireland and Austria. Butler played college basketball at Coastal Carolina University and was named the Big South Conference Men's Basketball Player of the Year twice, in 2001 and 2003.

== College ==
Butler is a 6'3", 205-pound small forward from Baltimore, Maryland, and attended Mount Saint Joseph College. He then enrolled to play basketball for the Chanticleers of Coastal Carolina in 1998–99. Through his freshman and sophomore seasons, he averaged only 9.3 points and 3.2 rebounds per game. Then, as a junior in 2000–01, he jumped his season average to 19.4 points and 5.8 rebounds per game en route to being named the conference play of the year for the first time. He became the third player from Coastal Carolina to win the award behind Derek Wilson and Tony Dunkin. Butler's scoring average was the best in the Big South Conference and his 47.6% shooting from three-point range was the second best in the nation.

The following year, in what would have been Butler's senior season, he was forced to sit out due to a medical redshirt. When he finally did return in 2002–03 for his belated final college season, he averaged 18.6 points and 6.4 rebounds per game. These averages were the second and sixth-best in the conference, respectively. Butler repeated as the Big South Player of the Year and became just the third player in conference history to win the award multiple times (Dunkin was selected for a national record four times, and UNC Asheville's Josh Pittman also won twice).

Butler then went undrafted in the 2003 NBA draft, which is considered one of the strongest NBA draft classes in history.

== Professional ==
After trying out with several NBA teams to try to make a roster, Butler then headed overseas to play professional basketball. His first stop was in Ireland to play for the UCC Demons. After several years he was traded to Allianz Swans Gmunden in Austria.
