= 1990 Big South Conference men's basketball tournament =

- Classification: Division I
- Season: 1989–90
- Teams: 7
- Site: Winthrop Coliseum; Rock Hill, SC
- Champions: Coastal Carolina (1st title)
- Winning coach: Russ Bergman (1st title)
- MVP: Milton Moore (UNC Asheville)

1989–90 Big South Conference men's basketball standings
	Conf.				Overall
Team	W		L	PCT	W		L	PCT
Coastal Carolina †	11	–	1	.917	23	–	6	.793
Campbell	7	–	5	.583	15	–	13	.536
UNC Asheville	7	–	5	.583	18	–	12	.600
Winthrop	6	–	6	.500	19	–	10	.655
Baptist	4	–	8	.333	9	–	19	.321
Augusta State	4	–	8	.333	8	–	20	.286
Radford	3	–	9	.250	7	–	22	.241
† 1990 Big South tournament winner Rankings from AP Poll

The 1990 Big South Conference men's basketball tournament took place March 1–3, 1990, at the Winthrop Coliseum in Rock Hill, South Carolina. For the first time in their school history, the Coastal Carolina Chanticleers won the tournament, led by head coach Russ Bergman.

== Format ==
All of the conference's seven members participated in the tournament, hosted at the Winthrop Coliseum, home of the Winthrop Eagles. Teams were seeded by conference winning percentage.

== Bracket ==
Quarterfinals; March 1
4	Winthrop	61
5	Baptist	53
2	Campbell	44
7	Radford	68
3	UNC Asheville	79
6	Augusta State	73

Semifinals; March 2
1	Coastal Carolina	62
4	Winthrop	49
3	UNC Asheville	78
7	Radford	72

Finals; March 3
1	Coastal Carolina	76
3	UNC Asheville	73

* Asterisk indicates overtime game

- Source

== All-Tournament Team ==
- Milton Moore, UNC Asheville
- Robert Dowdell, Coastal Carolina
- Eddie Lesaine, Coastal Carolina
- Tony Dunkin, Coastal Carolina
- George Henson, Winthrop
