= Big South Conference Men's Basketball Player of the Year =

- Awarded for: the most outstanding basketball player in the Big South Conference.
- Country: United States

History
- First award: 1986
- Most recent: Logan Duncomb, Winthrop

The Big South Conference Men's Basketball Player of the Year is an annual award given to the Big South Conference's most outstanding player. The award was first given following the 1985–86 season, the first year the league conducted basketball competition. (Note: The Big South Conference was formed in 1982–83 but did not compete in varsity basketball until 1985–86.)

A distinctive recipient of the Big South Player of the Year Award is Tony Dunkin. Dunkin, a 6-foot-7-inch (2.01 m) small forward, played for the Coastal Carolina Chanticleers from 1989 to 1993 and won the award all four seasons. He is the only NCAA Division I men's basketball player to ever earn four conference player of the year awards. (Note: Four Division I women's players have matched this achievement, although two were co-winners on at least one occasion. Lee Eun-jung of Louisiana–Monroe, then known as Northeast Louisiana, was the sole recipient of the Southland Conference award from 1983–1986, and Macee Williams of IUPUI was the sole recipient in the Horizon League from 2019–2022. Kim Smith of Utah received the award in the Mountain West Conference from 2003–2006, twice outright and twice shared. Jantel Lavender of Ohio State received Big Ten Conference honors from 2008–2011. In that conference, two separate awards are presented, one voted on by league coaches and the other by media; Lavender received the coaches' award in 2008, the media award in 2011, and both awards in 2009 and 2010.)

Coastal Carolina, which left the Big South for the Sun Belt Conference after the 2015–16 season, has the most all-time awards with nine and individual winners with five. Among current members, Winthrop has the most awards with seven. The only established Big South members without any winners are three of the six newest members of the conference—Presbyterian (joining in 2007), Gardner–Webb (2008), and Longwood (2012). Although Campbell's current tenure in the Big South dates only to 2011, it has three winners from its first conference tenure (1983–1994).

== Key ==
†	Co-Players of the Year
*	Awarded a national player of the year award that same season: UPI College Basketball Player of the Year (1954–55 to 1995–96); Oscar Robertson Trophy (1958–59 to present); Naismith College Player of the Year (1968–69 to present); John R. Wooden Award (1976–77 to present)
Player (X)	Denotes the number of times the player has been awarded the Big South Player of the Year award at that point

== Winners ==
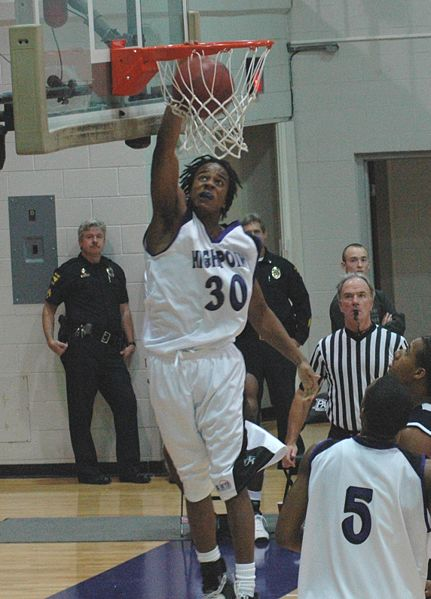
Arizona Reid, High Point, 2007 and 2008

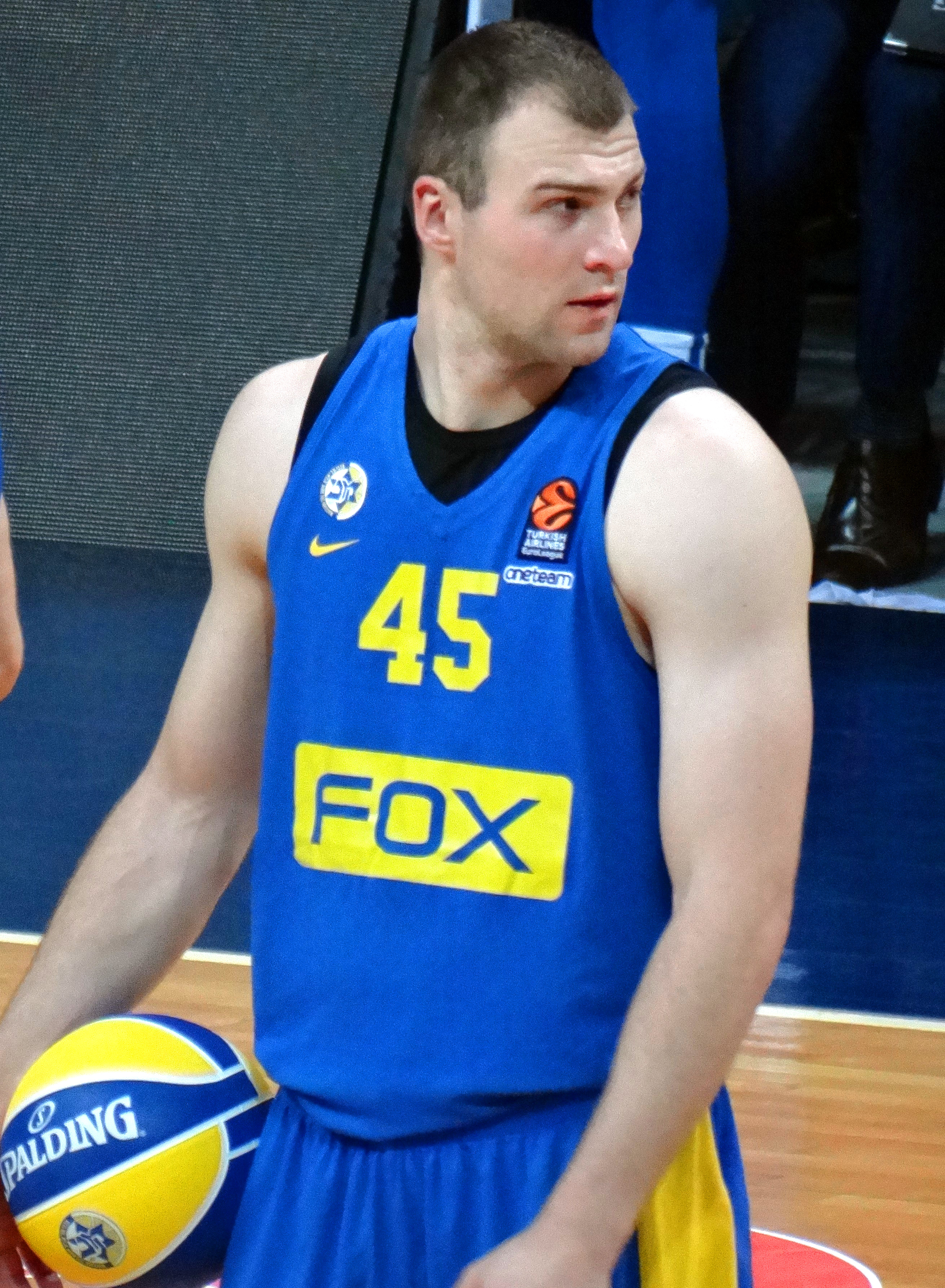
Artsiom Parakhouski, Radford, 2009 and 2010

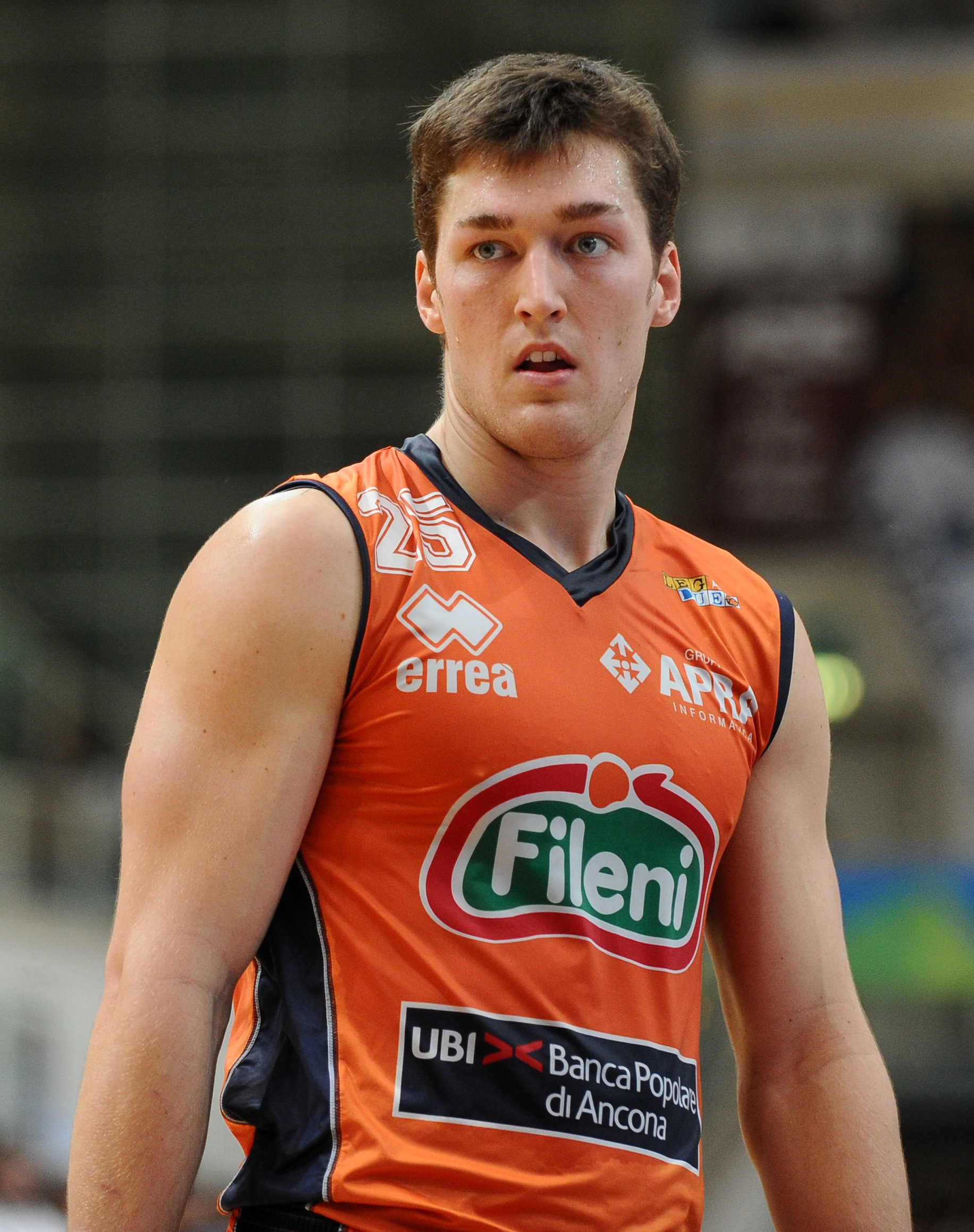
Jesse Sanders, Liberty, 2011

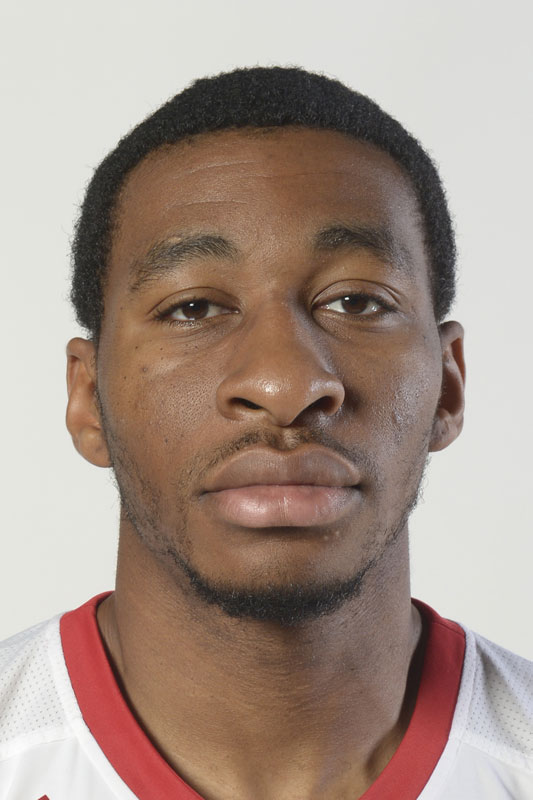
Stan Okoye, VMI, 2013

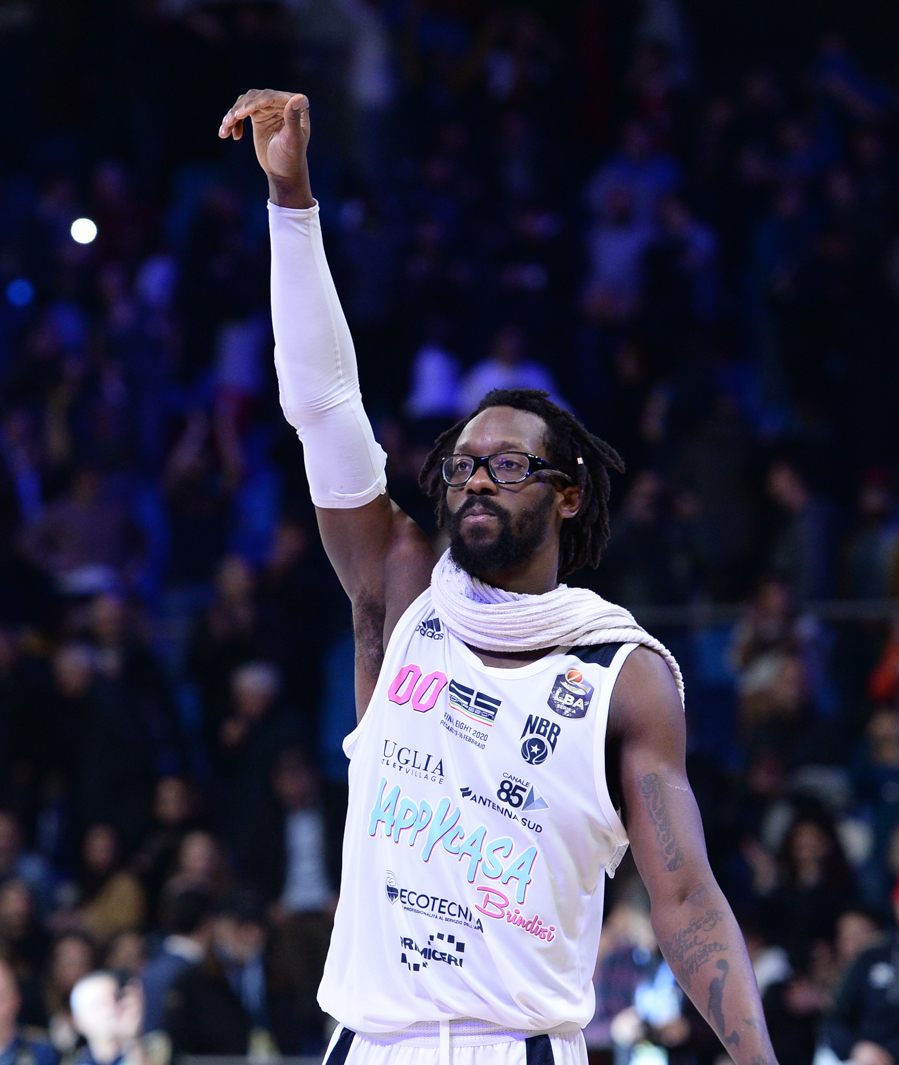
John Brown, High Point, 2014 and 2016

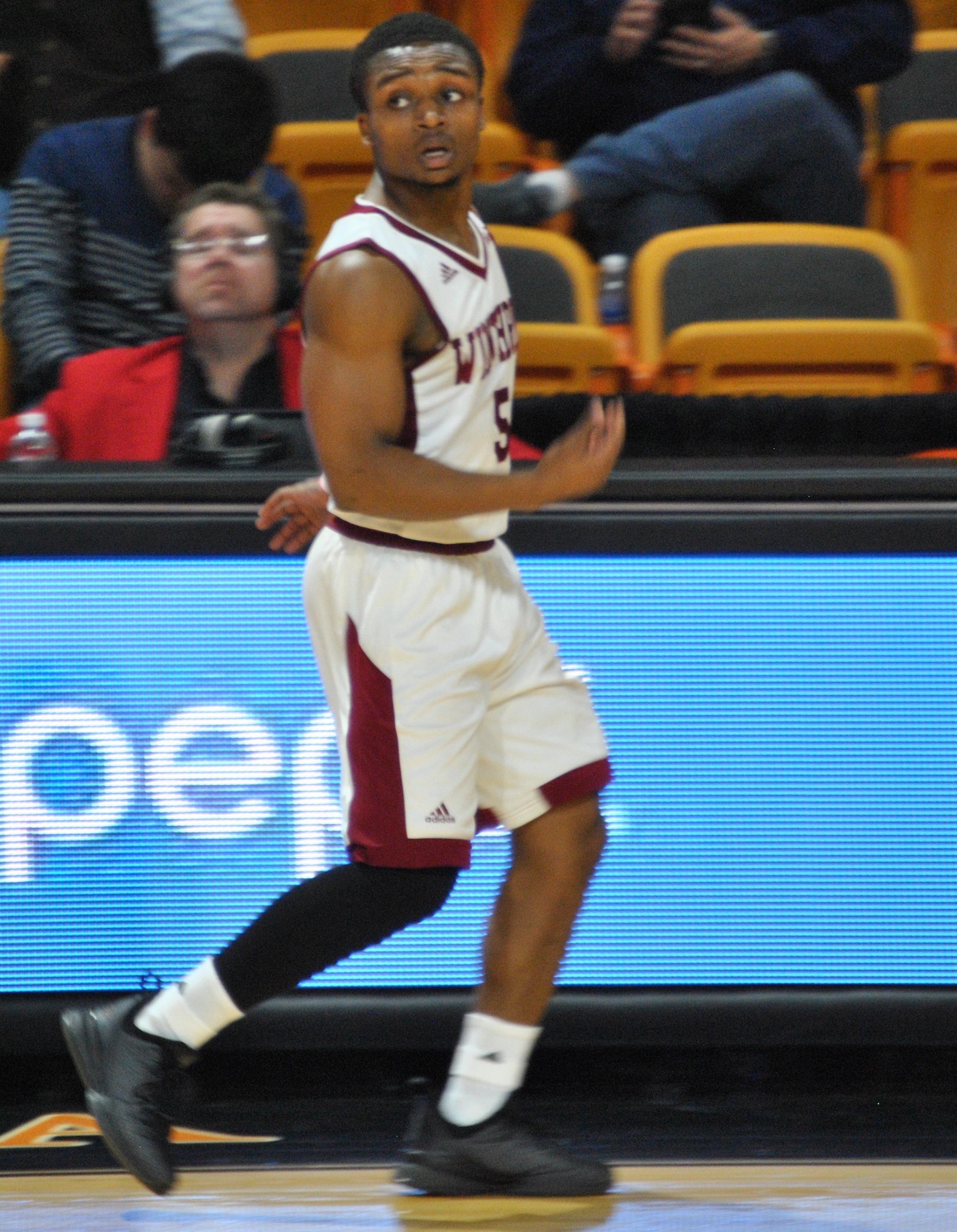
Keon Johnson, Winthrop, 2017

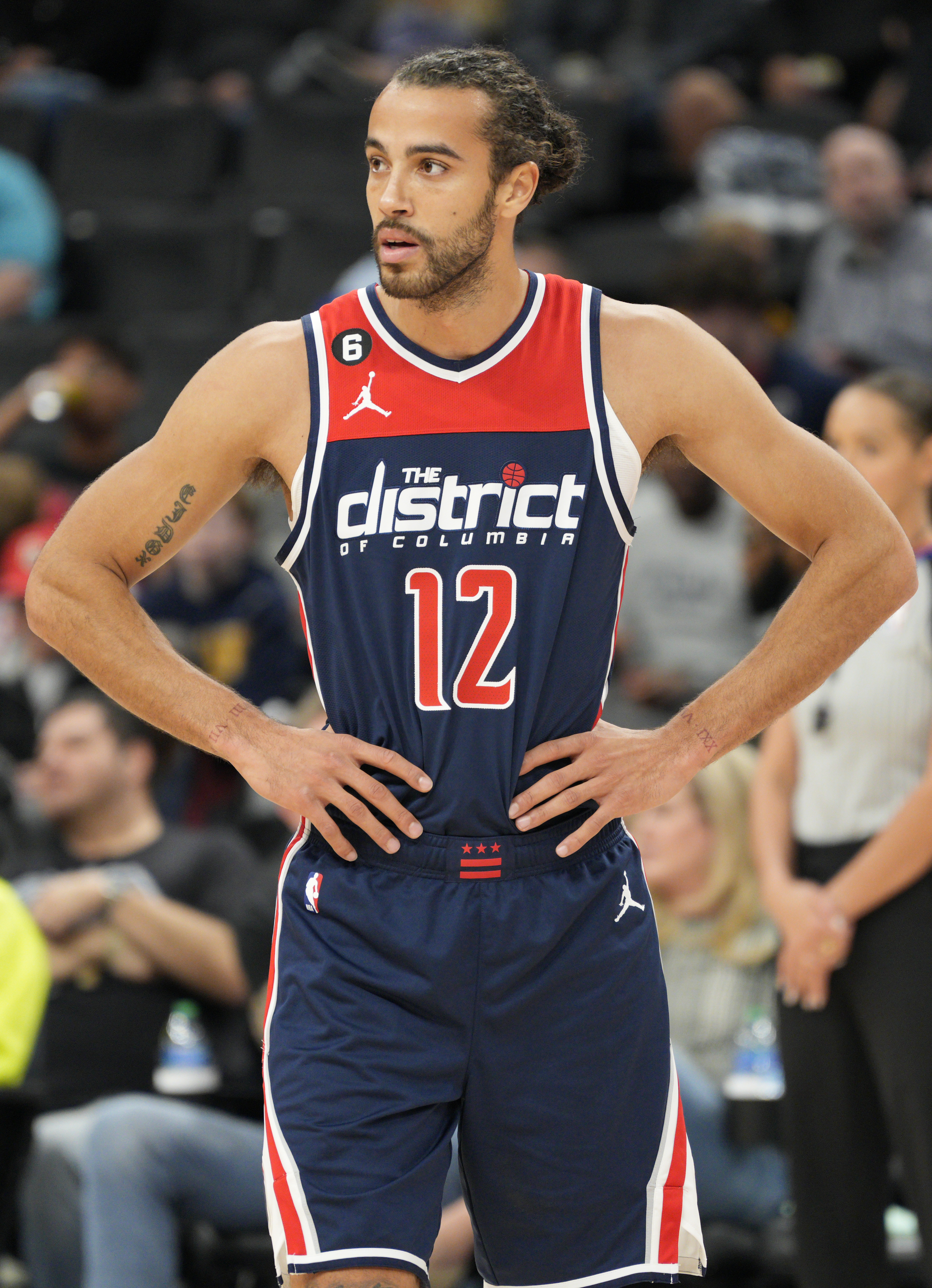
Xavier Cooks, Winthrop, 2018

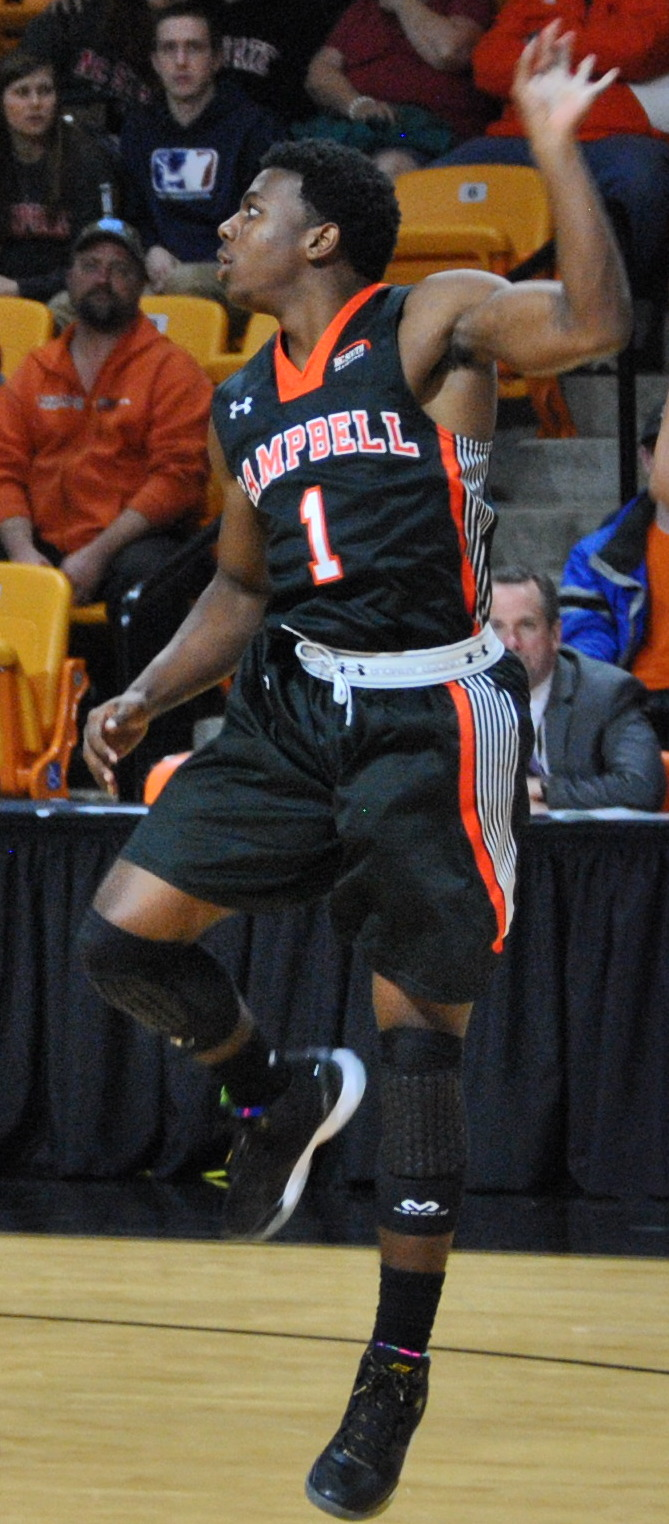
Chris Clemons, Campbell, 2019

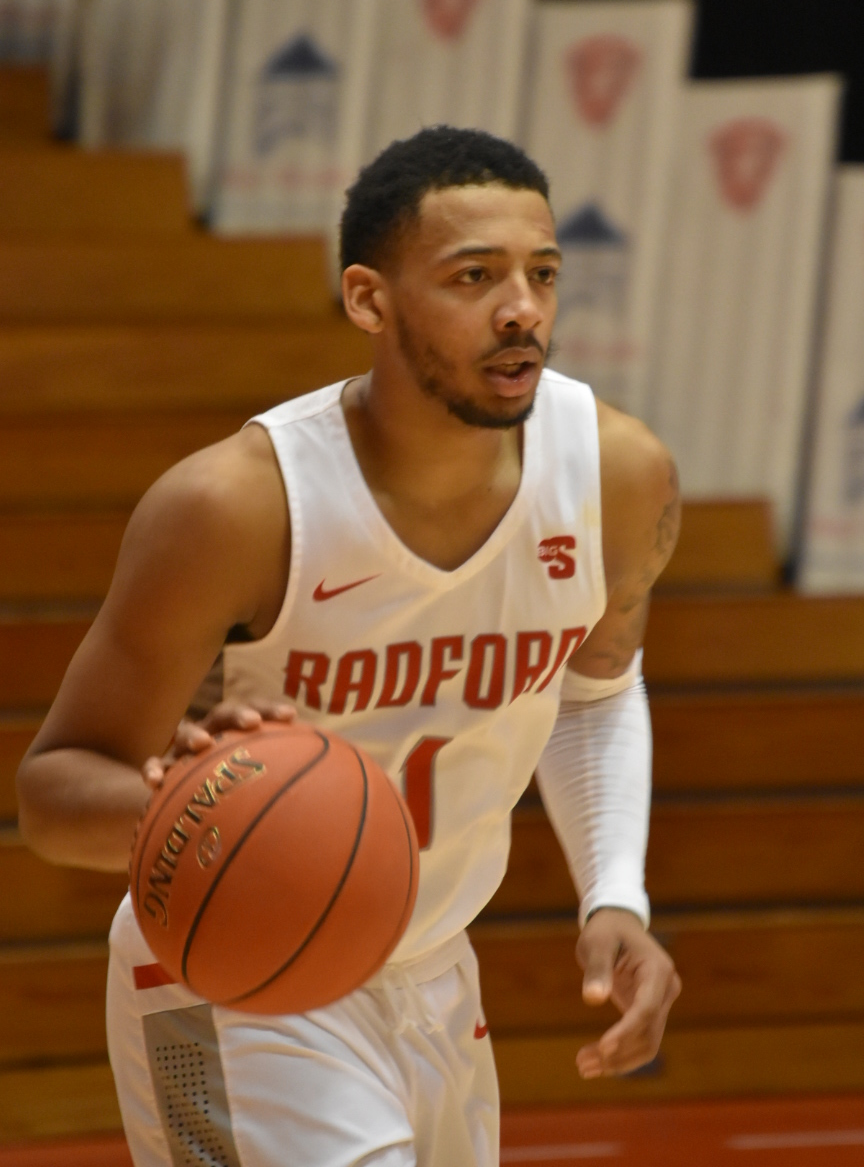
Carlik Jones, Radford, 2020

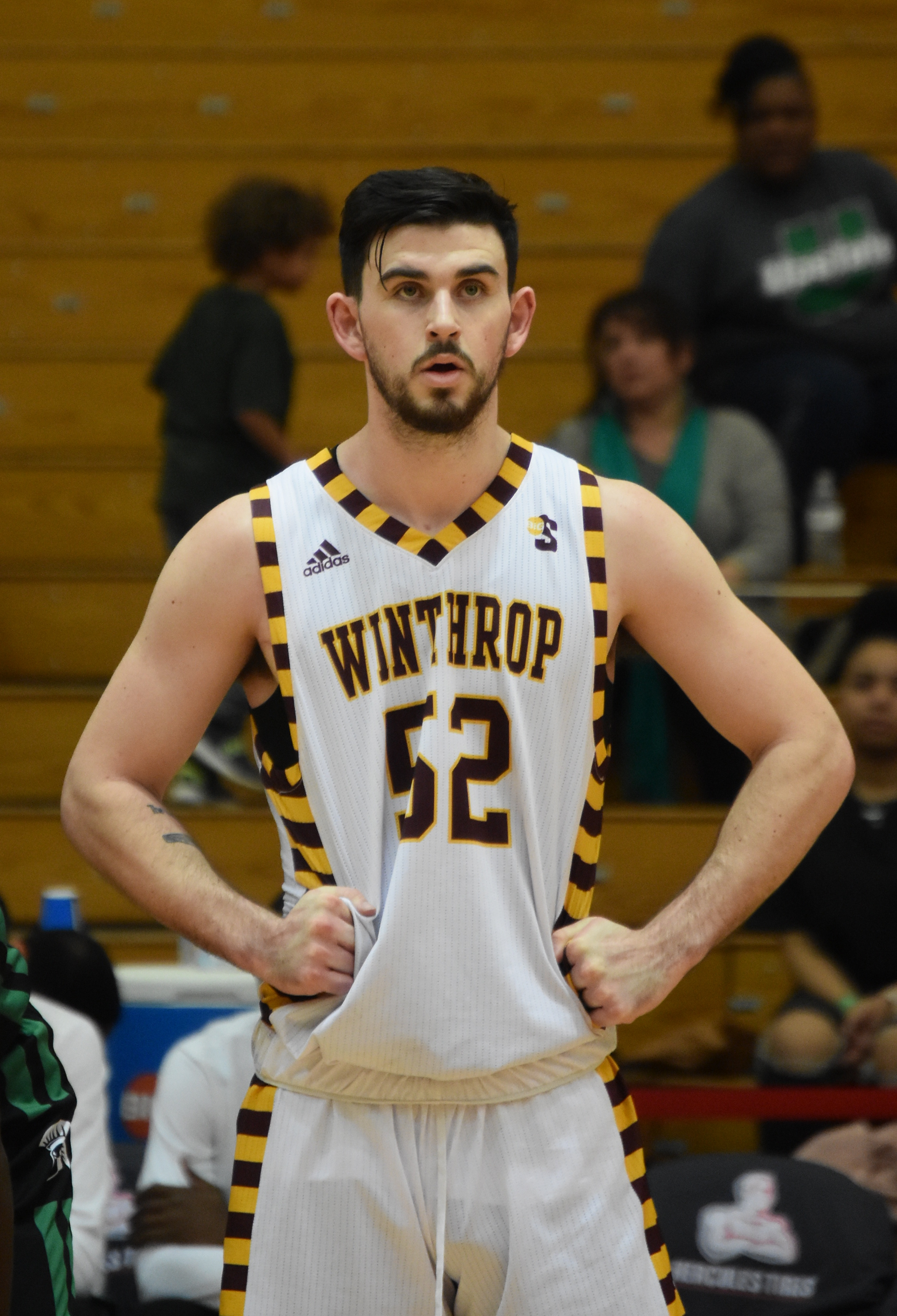
Chandler Vaudrin, Winthrop, 2021

Season	Player	School	Position	Class	Reference
1985–86	Fred McKinnon	Winthrop	F	Senior	
1986–87	Clarence Grier	Campbell	F	Senior	
1987–88	Derek Wilson	Coastal Carolina	PF / C	Junior	
1988–89	Henry Wilson	Campbell	C	Senior	
1989–90	Tony Dunkin	Coastal Carolina	SF	Freshman	
1990–91	Tony Dunkin (2)	Coastal Carolina	SF	Sophomore	
1991–92	Tony Dunkin (3)	Coastal Carolina	SF	Junior	
1992–93	Tony Dunkin (4)	Coastal Carolina	SF	Senior	
1993–94	Joe Spinks	Campbell	SF	Senior	
1994–95	Eric Burks	Charleston Southern	PG	Senior	
1995–96	T. L. Latson	Charleston Southern	SF	Senior	
1996–97	Josh Pittman	UNC Asheville	SG	Junior	
1997–98	Josh Pittman (2)	UNC Asheville	SG	Senior	
1998–99	Kevin Martin	UNC Asheville	SF	Senior	
1999–00	Jason Williams	Radford	F	Junior	
2000–01	Torrey Butler	Coastal Carolina	SF	Junior	
2001–02	Greg Lewis	Winthrop	PF	Senior	
2002–03	Torrey Butler (2)	Coastal Carolina	SF	Senior	
2003–04	Danny Gathings	High Point	PF	Junior	
2004–05	Pele Paelay	Coastal Carolina	SG	Junior	
2005–06	Jack Leasure	Coastal Carolina	PG / SG	Sophomore	
2006–07	Arizona Reid	High Point	PF	Junior	
2007–08	Arizona Reid (2)	High Point	PF	Senior	
2008–09	Artsiom Parakhouski	Radford	C	Junior	
2009–10	Artsiom Parakhouski (2)	Radford	C	Senior	
2010–11	Jesse Sanders	Liberty	PG	Junior	
2011–12	Matt Dickey	UNC Asheville	PG	Senior	
2012–13	Stan Okoye	VMI	PF	Senior	
2013–14	John Brown	High Point	PF	Sophomore	
2014–15	Saah Nimley	Charleston Southern	PG	Senior	
2015–16	John Brown (2)	High Point	PF	Senior	
2016–17	Keon Johnson	Winthrop	G	Senior	
2017–18	Xavier Cooks	Winthrop	PF	Senior	
2018–19	Chris Clemons	Campbell	PG	Senior	
2019–20	Carlik Jones	Radford	PG	Junior	
2020–21	Chandler Vaudrin	Winthrop	PG / SG	Senior	
2021–22	D. J. Burns	Winthrop	F	Junior	
2022–23	Drew Pember	UNC Asheville	F	Senior	
2023–24	Drew Pember (2)	UNC Asheville	F	Graduate	
2024–25	Taje' Kelly	Charleston Southern	PF	Senior	
2025–26	Logan Duncomb	Winthrop	C	Senior	

== Winners by school ==
School (year joined)	Winners	Years
Coastal Carolina (1983) (Note: Coastal Carolina left in 2016 for the Sun Belt Conference.)	9	1988, 1990, 1991, 1992, 1993, 2001, 2003, 2005, 2006
Winthrop (1983)	7	1986, 2002, 2017, 2018, 2021, 2022, 2026
UNC Asheville (1984)	6	1997, 1998, 1999, 2012, 2023, 2024
High Point (1999)	5	2004, 2007, 2008, 2014, 2016
Campbell (1983/2011) (Note: Campbell University left in 1994 to join the Trans America Athletic Conference, now known as the ASUN Conference. The Fighting Camels returned to the Big South in 2011, and will leave again in 2023, this time for the Colonial Athletic Association.)	4	1987, 1989, 1994, 2019
Charleston Southern (1983)	4	1995, 1996, 2015, 2025
Radford (1983)	4	2000, 2009, 2010, 2020
Liberty (1991) (Note: Liberty University left in 2018 to join the ASUN Conference, and will move to Conference USA in 2023.)	1	2011
VMI (2003) (Note: Virginia Military Institute (VMI), which joined the Big South from the Southern Conference in 2003, returned to the SoCon in 2014.)	1	2013
Gardner–Webb (2008)	0	—
Hampton (2018) (Note: Hampton University and North Carolina A&T State University (North Carolina A&T) left in 2022 for the Colonial Athletic Association.)	0	—
Longwood (2012)	0	—
North Carolina A&T (2021)	0	—
Presbyterian (2007)	0	—
USC Upstate (2018)	0	—
