= Big South Conference men's basketball tournament =

- Conference basketball championship
- Sport: Basketball
- Conference: Big South Conference
- Number of teams: 9
- Format: Single-elimination tournament
- Current stadium: Freedom Hall Civic Center
- Current location: Johnson City, Tennessee
- Played: 1986–present
- Last contest: 2026
- Current champion: High Point
- Most championships: Winthrop (13)
- TV partner: ESPN
- Official website: Big South Conference Men's Basketball

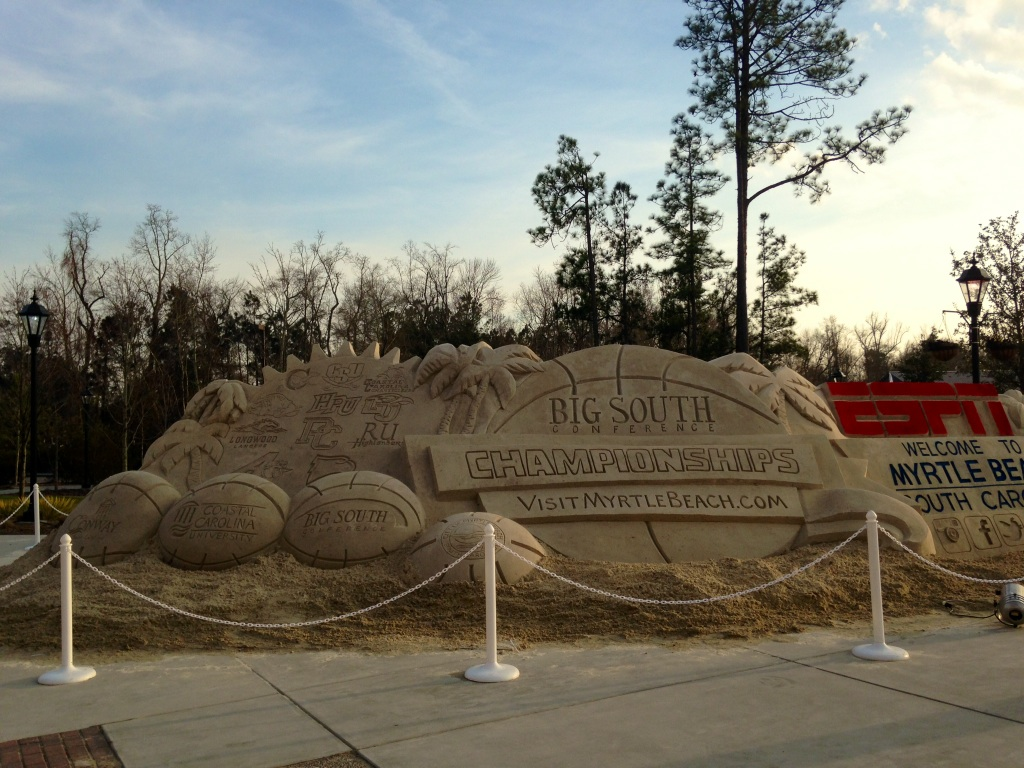
A sand sculpture during the 2015 Big South Conference men's basketball tournament held at Coastal Carolina University

The Big South Conference men's basketball tournament (popularly known as the Big South tournament) is the conference championship tournament in basketball for the Big South Conference. The tournament has been held every year since 1986. It is a single-elimination tournament and seeding is based on regular season records. The winner, declared conference champion, receives the conference's automatic bid to the NCAA men's basketball tournament. However, the conference did not have an automatic bid to the NCAA tournament from 1986 to 1990, and in 1995.

Before the 1994-95 season, Campbell departed the Big South due to scheduling conflicts. This left the conference with just five teams having played at the Division I level for at least five years, short of the six such members required by the NCAA for a conference to receive an automatic bid into the NCAA tournament. As a result, the Big South did not have an automatic qualifier to the 1995 NCAA tournament, its first time without an auto-bid since 1990; it regained an auto-bid in 1996 and has maintained an auto-bid in every year since, as of 2021.

From 2003 through 2012, the tournament was held mostly at campus sites. In 2003, the semifinals and finals were held at a predetermined site. After that, depending on the year, either the final, or both the semifinals and final, were hosted by the team that won the regular-season title. In 2012, the regular-season champion hosted the quarterfinals as well. Starting in 2013, the tournament was held at a single site for the first time since 2002, specifically Coastal Carolina's new HTC Center (known at the time of announcement as the Student Recreation and Convocation Center). The tournament remained at that venue until Coastal announced its 2016 departure for the Sun Belt Conference; the 2016 edition was held at the Pope Convocation Center on the campus of Campbell University. Beginning in 2017, the format changed yet again; the first round is now held at campus sites, with the quarterfinals and semifinals hosted by the regular-season winner and the final by the top surviving seed.

== Results ==
Year	Champion	Score	Runner-up	Tournament MVP	Location
1986	Charleston Southern	68–60	Augusta State	Ben Hinson, Charleston Southern	Savannah Civic Center • Savannah, GA
1987	Charleston Southern	64–63	Campbell	Ben Hinson, Charleston Southern	Savannah Civic Center • Savannah, GA
1988	Winthrop	71–56	Radford	John Weiss, Winthrop	Winthrop Coliseum • Rock Hill, SC
1989	UNC Asheville	93–78	Campbell	Milton Moore, UNC Asheville	Winthrop Coliseum • Rock Hill, SC
1990	Coastal Carolina	76–73	UNC Asheville	Milton Moore, UNC Asheville	Winthrop Coliseum • Rock Hill, SC
1991	Coastal Carolina	89–54	Augusta State	Tony Dunkin, Coastal Carolina	Civic Center of Anderson • Anderson, SC
1992	Campbell	67–53	Charleston Southern	Mark Mocnik, Campbell	Civic Center of Anderson • Anderson, SC
1993	Coastal Carolina	78–65	Winthrop	Tony Dunkin, Coastal Carolina	North Charleston Coliseum • North Charleston, SC
1994	Liberty	76–62	Campbell	Peter Aluma, Liberty	North Charleston Coliseum • North Charleston, SC
1995	Charleston Southern	68–67	UNC Greensboro	Eric Burks, Charleston Southern	Vines Center • Lynchburg, VA
1996	UNC Greensboro	79–53	Liberty	Scott Hartzell, UNC Greensboro	Vines Center • Lynchburg, VA
1997	Charleston Southern	64–54	Liberty	Peter Aluma, Liberty	Vines Center • Lynchburg, VA
1998	Radford	63–61	UNC Asheville	Kevin Robinson, Radford	Vines Center • Lynchburg, VA
1999	Winthrop	86–74	Radford	Heson Groves, Winthrop	Asheville Civic Center • Asheville, NC
2000	Winthrop	81–68	UNC Asheville	Greg Lewis, Winthrop	Asheville Civic Center • Asheville, NC
2001	Winthrop	67–65	Radford	Andrey Savtchenko, Radford	Roanoke Civic Center • Roanoke, VA
2002	Winthrop	70–48	High Point	Greg Lewis, Winthrop	Roanoke Civic Center • Roanoke, VA
2003	UNC Asheville	85–71	Radford	Andre Smith, UNC Asheville	Vines Center • Lynchburg, VA
2004	Liberty	89–44	High Point	Danny Gathings, High Point	Vines Center • Lynchburg, VA
2005	Winthrop	68–46	Charleston Southern	Torrell Martin, Winthrop	Winthrop Coliseum • Rock Hill, SC
2006	Winthrop	51–50	Coastal Carolina	Torrell Martin, Winthrop	Winthrop Coliseum • Rock Hill, SC
2007	Winthrop	84–81	VMI	Craig Bradshaw, Winthrop	Winthrop Coliseum • Rock Hill, SC
2008	Winthrop	66–48	UNC Asheville	Michael Jenkins, Winthrop	Justice Center • Asheville, NC
2009	Radford	108–94	VMI	Artsiom Parakhouski, Radford	Dedmon Center • Radford, VA
2010	Winthrop	64–53	Coastal Carolina	Mantoris Robinson, Winthrop	Kimbel Arena • Conway, SC
2011	UNC Asheville	60–47	Coastal Carolina	Matt Dickey, UNC Asheville	Kimbel Arena • Conway, SC
2012	UNC Asheville	80–64	VMI	J. P. Primm, UNC Asheville	Kimmel Arena • Asheville, NC
2013	Liberty	87–76	Charleston Southern	Davon Marshall, Liberty	HTC Center • Conway, SC
2014	Coastal Carolina	76–61	Winthrop	Warren Gillis, Coastal Carolina	HTC Center • Conway, SC
2015	Coastal Carolina	81–70	Winthrop	Elijah Wilson, Coastal Carolina	HTC Center • Conway, SC
2016	UNC Asheville	77–68	Winthrop	Dwayne Sutton, UNC Asheville	Pope Convocation Center • Buies Creek, NC
2017	Winthrop	76–59	Campbell	Keon Johnson, Winthrop	Winthrop Coliseum • Rock Hill, SC
2018	Radford	55–52	Liberty	Carlik Jones, Radford	Dedmon Center • Radford, VA
2019	Gardner–Webb	76–64	Radford	D. J. Laster, Gardner–Webb	Dedmon Center • Radford, VA
2020	Winthrop	76–68	Hampton	Hunter Hale, Winthrop	Winthrop Coliseum • Rock Hill, SC
2021	Winthrop	80–53	Campbell	Chandler Vaudrin, Winthrop	Winthrop Coliseum • Rock Hill, SC
2022	Longwood	79–58	Winthrop	Isaiah Wilkins, Longwood	Bojangles Coliseum • Charlotte, NC
2023	UNC Asheville	77–73	Campbell	Drew Pember, UNC Asheville	Bojangles Coliseum • Charlotte, NC
2024	Longwood	85–59	UNC Asheville	Walyn Napper, Longwood	Qubein Center • High Point, NC
2025	High Point	81–69	Winthrop	Bobby Pettiford, High Point	Freedom Hall Civic Center • Johnson City, TN
2026	High Point	91–76	Winthrop	Terry Anderson, High Point	Freedom Hall Civic Center • Johnson City, TN

== Performance By School ==
School	Championships	Championship Years
Winthrop	13	1988, 1999, 2000, 2001, 2002, 2005, 2006, 2007, 2008, 2010, 2017, 2020, 2021
UNC Asheville	6	1989, 2003, 2011, 2012, 2016, 2023
Coastal Carolina (Note: No longer a conference member.)	5	1990, 1991, 1993, 2014, 2015
Charleston Southern	4	1986, 1987, 1995, 1997
Radford	3	1998, 2009, 2018
Liberty	3	1994, 2004, 2013
High Point	2	2025, 2026
Longwood	2	2022, 2024
Gardner–Webb	1	2019
UNC Greensboro	1	1996
Campbell	1	1992
TOTAL	41	

== NCAA Tournament appearances ==
Year	Big South Team	Opponent	Result
1991	(15) Coastal Carolina	(2) Indiana	L 69–79
1992	(16) Campbell	(1) Duke	L 56–82
1993	(16) Coastal Carolina	(1) Michigan	L 53–84
1994	(16) Liberty	(1) North Carolina	L 51–71
1995	No automatic qualifier		
1996	(15) UNC Greensboro	(2) Cincinnati	L 61–66
1997	(15) Charleston Southern	(2) UCLA	L 75–109
1998	(16) Radford	(1) Duke	L 63–99
1999	(16) Winthrop	(1) Auburn	L 41–80
2000	(14) Winthrop	(3) Oklahoma	L 50–74
2001	(16) Winthrop	(16) Northwestern State	L 67–71
2002	(16) Winthrop	(1) Duke	L 37–84
2003	(16a) UNC Asheville	(16b) Texas Southern (1) Texas	W 92–84^{OT} L 61–82
2004	(16) Liberty	(1) Saint Joseph's	L 63–82
2005	(14) Winthrop	(3) Gonzaga	L 64–74
2006	(15) Winthrop	(2) Tennessee	L 61–63
2007	(11) Winthrop	(6) Notre Dame (3) Oregon	W 74–64; L 61–75
2008	(13) Winthrop	(4) Washington State	L 40–71
2009	(16) Radford	(1) North Carolina	L 58–101
2010	(16b) Winthrop	(16a) Arkansas-Pine Bluff	L 44–61
2011	(16) UNC Asheville	(16) Arkansas–Little Rock (1) Pittsburgh	W 81–77^{OT} L 51–74
2012	(16) UNC Asheville	(1) Syracuse	L 65–72
2013	(16) Liberty	(16) North Carolina A&T	L 72–73
2014	(16) Coastal Carolina	(1) Virginia	L 59–70
2015	(16) Coastal Carolina	(1) Wisconsin	L 72–86
2016	(15) UNC Asheville	(2) Villanova	L 56–86
2017	(13) Winthrop	(4) Butler	L 64–76
2018	(16) Radford	(16) LIU Brooklyn (1) Villanova	W 71–61; L 61–87
2019	(16) Gardner–Webb	(1) Virginia	L 56–71
2021	(12) Winthrop	(5) Villanova	L 63–73
2022	(14) Longwood	(3) Tennessee	L 56–88
2023	(15) UNC Asheville	(2) UCLA	L 53–86
2024	(16) Longwood	(1) Houston	L 46–86
2025	(13) High Point	(4) Purdue	L 63–75
2026	(12) High Point	(5) Wisconsin (4) Arkansas	W 83–82; L 88–94

- 2020 NCAA tournament was canceled due to COVID-19.

== See also ==
- Big South Conference women's basketball tournament
