= Pele Paelay =

Liberian basketball player

Personal information
- Born: June 15, 1984 (age 42) Monrovia, Liberia
- Listed height: 6 ft 3 in (1.91 m)
- Listed weight: 195 lb (88 kg)

Career information
- High school: Magruder (Derwood, Maryland)
- College: Coastal Carolina (2002–2006)
- NBA draft: 2006: undrafted
- Playing career: 2006–2015
- Position: Shooting guard

Career history
- 2006–2007: Minot SkyRockets
- 2008: Great Falls Explorers
- 2008–2009: Saar-Pfalz Braves
- 2009: JL Bourg
- 2009–2010: Étoile Charleville-Mézières
- 2010–2011: S.Oliver Baskets
- 2011–2012: UJAP Quimper 29
- 2012–2013: Elitzur Yavne
- 2013: Vestelspor Manisa
- 2013–2014: JA Vichy
- 2015: Sokhumi

Career highlights
- AP Honorable mention All-American (2005); Big South Player of the Year (2005); First-team All-Big South (2005)

Pele Paelay (born June 15, 1984) is a Liberian former professional basketball player. Although he was born in Liberia, he grew up in the state of Maryland before playing at Coastal Carolina University from 2002 to 2006. Paelay was named the Big South Conference Player of the Year in his junior season in 2004–05. Upon graduation in 2006, he began his professional career which has taken him to numerous countries abroad. Paelay is now the assistant coach for the girls varsity basketball team at the Steward School.

== High school ==
Paelay attended Magruder High School in Derwood, Maryland. He graduated in 2002 after starring in both basketball and soccer. On the pitch, Paelay was named the Washington, D.C. Area Player of the Year in fall 2001 after scoring 19 goals, recording 12 assists and leading Magruder to their first ever boys' soccer state championship. He scored eight goals in the playoffs alone, five of which were game winners. Among the game winners, Paelay scored with less than 30 seconds remaining in the state championship game to give Magruder the 3–2 win.

In basketball, Paelay led Magruder to a 27–0 record and a state championship during his junior season in 2000–01. He was named the Most Valuable Player of the state Final Four. As a senior, he averaged 17.7 points, 6.0 rebounds and 3.0 assists per game and was named to the Second Team All-Metro and All-County squads. He was also a participant in the D.C. Capital Classic, a postseason all-star game featuring the best high school seniors from the Washington area.

== College ==
Paelay enrolled at Coastal Carolina in fall 2002 to play basketball for the Chanticleers. During his four-year career he recorded 1,178 points, 439 rebounds, 199 assists and 139 steals. His best season came in his junior year of 2004–05: his career-highs of points (16.8) and steals (2.4) per game led the Big South Conference, as did his field goals made (175) and attempted (401), 70 steals, and total points (488). Paelay was honored as the Big South Player of the Year and the Associated Press named him an Honorable Mention All-American. Although Paelay did not have quite as much personal success the next year, his senior season in 2005–06, he was the second best player behind sophomore teammate Jack Leasure (who happened to be that season's conference player of the year), and the two of them teamed up to give Coastal Carolina a 20-win season and second-place finish in the Big South.

== Professional ==
No National Basketball Association teams showed interest in drafting nor signing Paelay to a contract upon his graduation, so he began his professional career overseas. Since 2006, he has played in leagues in France, Israel, Germany, and Turkey.

== Footnotes ==
- ^{a} Pele Paelay was born in Liberia but is still considered American.
