= Demario =

- Gender: Male

Origin
- Region of origin: United States

Other names
- Variant form: DeMario

Demario or DeMario is an American masculine given name with several possible origins. It may be a combination of the element de and the Italian name Mario, which could be simply ornamental or mean 'son of Mario', or a variant of Damaris, which means 'dominant woman' or 'calf; heifer'. It is often found among African Americans.

Notable people with the given name include:

- Demario Beck (born 1994), American football player
- Demario Davis (born 1989), American football player
- Demario Douglas (born 2000), American football player
- DeMario Mayfield (born 1991), American-born Iraqi basketball player
- DeMario Minter (born 1984), American football player
- DeMario Pressley (born 1985), American football player
- Demario Richard (born 1996), American football player
- Demario Warren (born 1985), American football coach and player
- Moneybagg Yo (real name DeMario White; born 1991), American rapper
