= Jason Williams (basketball, born 1979) =

American basketball player

Personal information
- Born: April 15, 1979 (age 47)
- Listed height: 6 ft 6 in (1.98 m)
- Listed weight: 200 lb (91 kg)

Career information
- High school: Bladensburg (Bladensburg, Maryland)
- College: Radford (1997–2001)
- NBA draft: 2001: undrafted
- Playing career: 2001–2009
- Position: Forward

Career history
- 2001: Washington Justice
- 2002: Greenville Groove
- 2002–2003: Prissi Macon
- 2004–2005: Maryland Nighthawks
- 2005–2006: Henan Dragons
- 2006: Northeastern Pennsylvania Breakers
- 2006: Ciro Perez
- 2007–2008: Albany Patroons
- 2008–2009: Kecskeméti TE

Career highlights
- NBA D-League champion (2002); All-NRL Team (2001); Big South Player of the Year (2000); 2× First Team All-Big South (2000, 2001)

Jason Williams (born April 15, 1979) is an American former basketball player.

== Playing career ==
Williams is from Bladensburg, Maryland and attended Bladensburg High School. In his senior year of 1996–97, Williams was named to Prince George's County's 3A/2A First Team and also to the Washington, D.C. all-metro area fourth team.

Williams went on to play college basketball at Radford University from 1997 to 2001. During his four-year career, Williams recorded 1,176 points (12.6 per game average), 412 rebounds (4.4), 173 assists (1.9) and 128 steals (1.4). His best season came in 1999–2000 during his junior year. He averaged career-highs of 18.1 points and 6.5 rebounds per game as he led the Highlanders to a 12–2 Big South Conference record. They won the conference regular season championship and Williams was named the Big South Conference Player of the Year. Other accolades in college include being a two-time First Team All-Conference player (2000, 2001) and an All-Big South tournament selection (2001).

After college, Williams had a brief stint in the NBA Development League. He appeared in eight games for the Greenville Groove in the late portion of the 2001–02 season. In the 2002 playoffs he appeared in five games; the Groove went on to win the D-League championship. In 2008–09 Williams played for Kecskeméti TE, a professional basketball team in Hungary.
