= Derek Wilson =

Derek Wilson may refer to:

- Derek Wilson (architect) (1922–2016), New Zealand architect
- Derek Wilson (actor) (born 1978), American actor
- Derek Wilson (basketball) (born 1967), American basketball player
