= Logan Duncomb =

American college basketball player (born 2003)

No. 51 – Notre Dame Fighting Irish
- Position: Center
- Conference: Atlantic Coast Conference

Personal information
- Born: April 17, 2003 (age 23)
- Listed height: 6 ft 10 in (2.08 m)
- Listed weight: 250 lb (113 kg)

Career information
- High school: Moeller (Cincinnati, Ohio)
- College: Indiana (2021–2023); Winthrop (2024–2026); Notre Dame (2026–present)

Career highlights
- Big South Player of the Year (2026); First-team All-Big South (2026)

Logan Duncomb (born April 17, 2003) is an American college basketball player for the Notre Dame Fighting Irish of the Atlantic Coast Conference (ACC). He previously played for the Indiana Hoosiers and Winthrop Eagles. He was the Big South Player of the Year with Winthrop in 2026.

== High school career ==
Duncomb attended Moeller High School in Cincinnati, Ohio, winning the 2019 Ohio state championship and being named a McDonalds All-American nominee. Rated the 80th best player in his class by 247 Sports, he committed to play college basketball for the Indiana Hoosiers.

== College career ==
Duncomb played sparingly in two seasons with Indiana. In April 2023, he transferred to Xavier. On October 4, before playing a game for Xavier, Duncomb announced he would step away from basketball due to mental health, taking a redshirt.

In 2024, he joined the Winthrop Eagles, playing in 24 games in his redshirt junior season. His playing time was limited as he was the backup for Kelton Talford. As a redshirt senior, he became a starter, averaging 24.3 minutes per game along with career high per game totals, including 18.3 points per game. He was named Big South Player of the Year and First-team All-Big South.

In April 2026, he transferred to Notre Dame.

== Career statistics ==
Legend
GP	Games played	GS	Games started	MPG	Minutes per game
FG%	Field goal percentage	3P%	3-point field goal percentage	FT%	Free throw percentage
RPG	Rebounds per game	APG	Assists per game	SPG	Steals per game
BPG	Blocks per game	PPG	Points per game	**Bold**	Career high

=== College ===
Year	Team	GP	GS	MPG	FG%	3P%	FT%	RPG	APG	SPG	BPG	PPG
2021–22	Indiana	9	0	2.2	.500	–	**1.000**	.7	.1	.1	.1	.7
2022–23	Indiana	9	0	5.7	**.750**	–	.286	1.7	.2	.1	.6	2.9
2023–24	Xavier	Redshirt										
2024–25	Winthrop	24	0	8.0	.542	–	.667	2.5	.1	.3	.5	3.0
2025–26	Winthrop	**32**	**28**	**24.3**	.600	.000	.735	**8.9**	**1.6**	**.8**	**.8**	**18.3**
Career		74	28	14.1	.598	.000	.719	5.0	.8	.5	.6	9.3
