= Jesse Sanders =

American basketball player (born 1989)

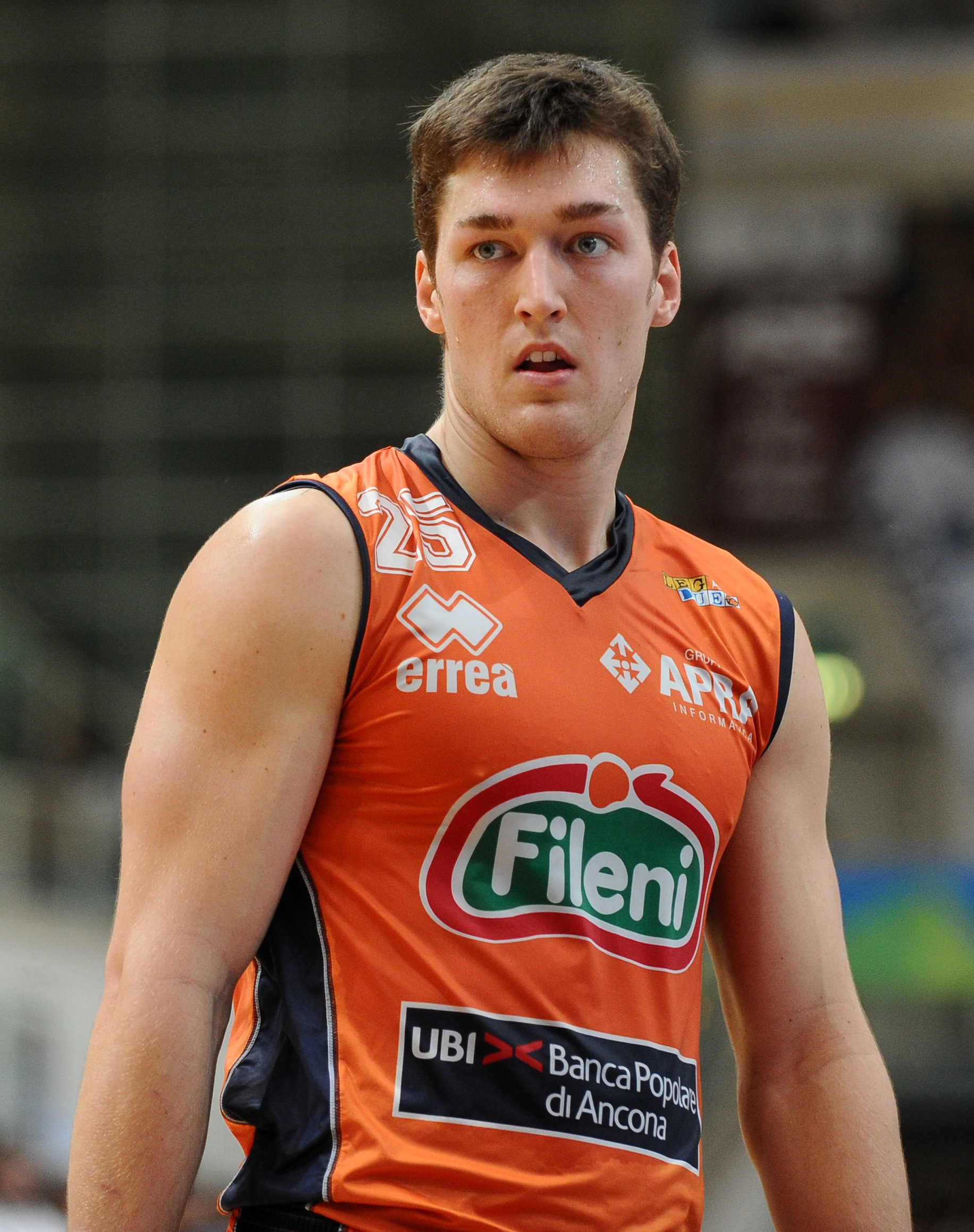
- Sanders with Aurora Basket Jesi in 2012

Personal information
- Born: June 5, 1989 (age 37) Sugar Land, Texas, U.S.
- Listed height: 6 ft 3 in (1.91 m)
- Listed weight: 200 lb (91 kg)

Career information
- High school: Homeschool Christian Youth Association (Richmond, Texas)
- College: Liberty (2008–2012)
- NBA draft: 2012: undrafted
- Playing career: 2012–2018
- Position: Point guard
- Number: 25

Career history
- 2012–2013: Fileni BPA Jesi
- 2013–2014: Sydney Kings
- 2014–2015: Limburg United
- 2015–2016: Tigers Tübingen
- 2016–2017: BG Göttingen
- 2017–2018: S.L. Benfica

Career highlights
- Belgian League steals leader (2015); AP Honorable mention All-American (2011); Big South Player of the Year (2011); 2× First-team All-Big South (2011, 2012)

Jesse Sanders (born June 5, 1989) is an American former professional basketball player. Sanders is known for his decorated college career for Liberty University, where he was the first NCAA Division I player to record a triple-double in each of his four varsity seasons.

== College career ==
At Liberty, Sanders was a four-year starter at point guard. For his career, he scored 1,235 points (9.7 per game). He also graduated as the school's all-time assist leader with 726. In 2011, Sanders was named the Big South Conference Player of the Year and an honorable mention All-American by the Associated Press. In the 2011–12 season, his 8.0 assists per game was the third-highest mark in the nation.

== Professional career ==
=== Jesi (2012–2013) ===
In June 2012, Sanders signed with Fileni BPA Jesi of Italy for the 2012–13 season. In 25 games, he averaged 9.7 points, 5.5 rebounds, 2.1 assists and 1.4 steals per game in his first professional season.

=== Sydney Kings (2013–2014) ===
On June 8, 2013, Sanders signed with the Sydney Kings for the 2013–14 NBL season. On November 14, 2013, Sanders was informed that the November 15 game against the Townsville Crocodiles would be his last, after the Kings signed former NBA veteran Sam Young.

On February 23, 2014, the Kings announced that Sanders would be returning to the club following import Charles Carmouche's decision to return the United States. On March 16, 2014, Sanders recorded a near triple-double with 24 points, 10 rebounds and 8 assists in a crucial 100-90 win over the Adelaide 36ers.

In 13 games for the Kings (over his two stints), Sanders averaged 10.5 points, 4.7 rebounds and 3.5 assists per game.

=== Limburg United (2014–2015) ===
On August 24, 2014, Sanders signed with Limburg United of Belgium for the 2014–15 season.

=== Tübingen (2015–2016) ===
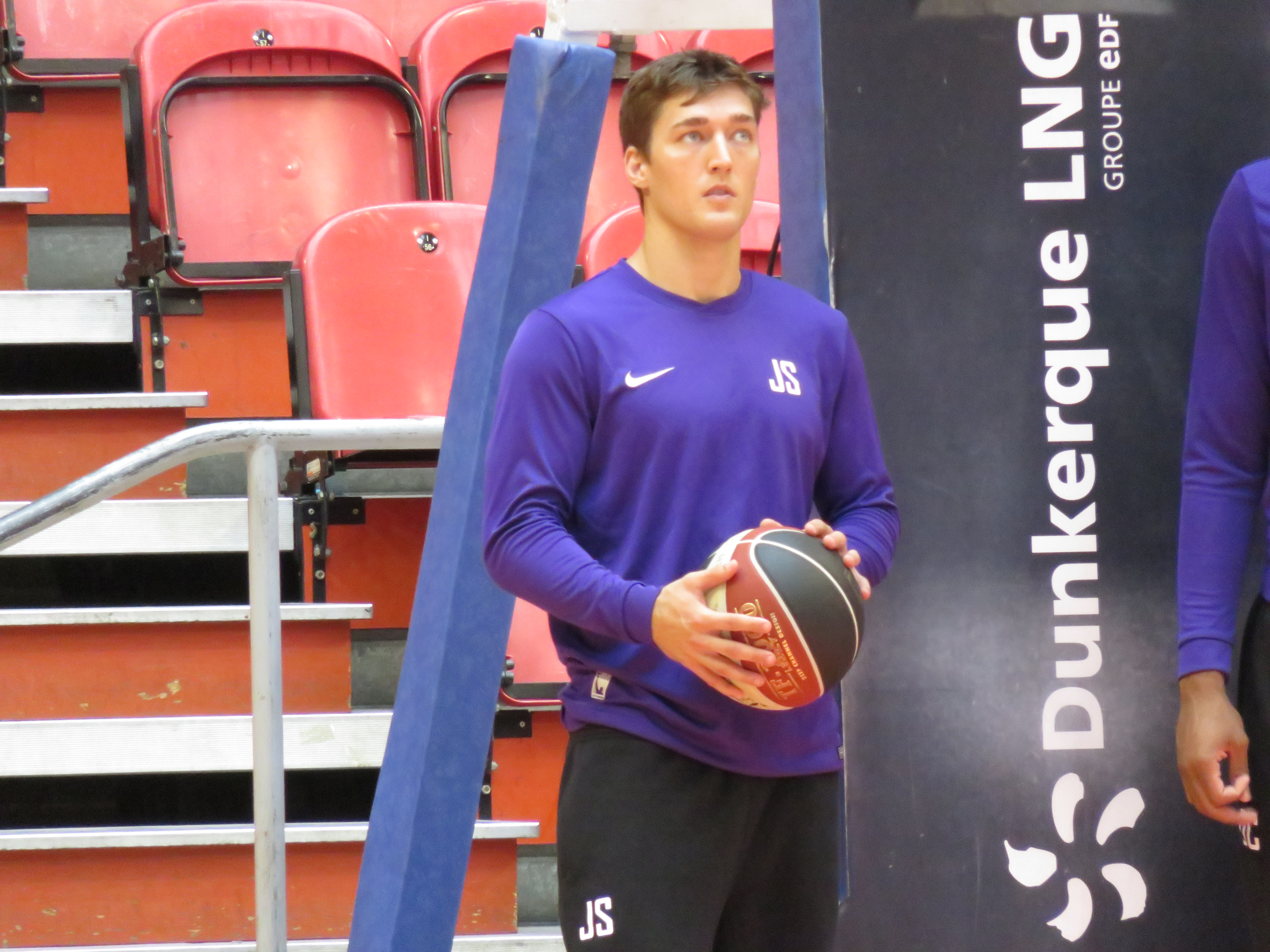
Sanders as BG Göttingen player in September 2016

On May 22, 2015, Sanders signed with Tigers Tübingen of Germany.

=== Göttingen (2016–2017) ===
On June 21, 2016, Sanders signed with BG Göttingen for the 2016–17 season.

=== Benfica (2017–2018) ===
On August 21, 2017, Sanders signed with S.L. Benfica for the 2017–18 season.

== Personal ==
Sanders is the son of Tom and Nancy Sanders. He is one of six children: two older brothers, Thomas and Ethan, a younger brother, John, and two sisters. He also has a wife named Courtney.

As a child, Sanders and his brother, Thomas, started a small business called Sanders Bros Landscaping.
