= Keon Johnson (basketball, born 1995) =

American basketball player (born 1995)

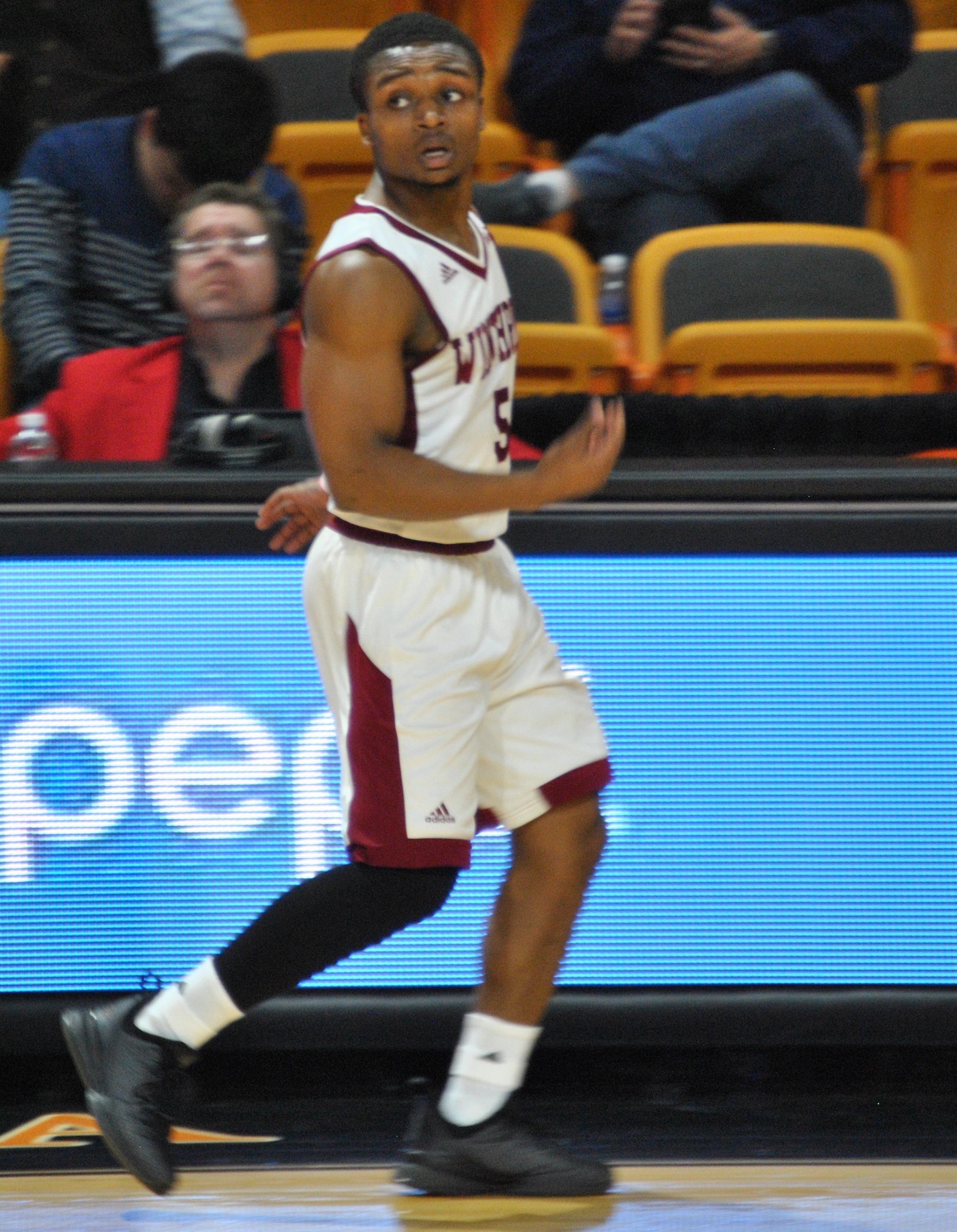
- Johnson with the Winthrop Eagles in 2016

Personal information
- Born: September 29, 1995 (age 31)
- Listed height: 5 ft 7 in (1.70 m)
- Listed weight: 160 lb (73 kg)

Career information
- High school: Mansfield (Mansfield, Ohio)
- College: Winthrop (2013–2017)
- NBA draft: 2017: undrafted
- Playing career: 2017–2018
- Position: Point guard

Career history
- 2017–2018: Sigal Prishtina

Career highlights
- AP Honorable Mention All-American (2017); Big South Player of the Year (2017); 2× First-team All-Big South (2016, 2017); Big South tournament MVP (2017)

Keon Johnson (born September 29, 1995) is an American former professional basketball player. He played college basketball at Winthrop University, where he was named Big South Conference Player of the Year in 2017.

Johnson passed the 2,000 career point mark in a 2017 Big South tournament game, making him Winthrop's all-time Division I scoring leader. Johnson led the Eagles to the tournament championship, earning MVP honors and helping the team advance to the 2017 NCAA tournament. At the close of the season, Johnson was named Big South Player of the Year and an honorable mention All-American by the Associated Press.

In 2020, Johnson was voted into the 2010–19 Big South Men's Basketball All-Decade Team.
