= Craig Bradshaw (basketball) =

New Zealand basketball player (born 1983)

Personal information
- Born: 28 July 1983 (age 43) Lower Hutt, New Zealand
- Listed height: 208 cm (6 ft 10 in)
- Listed weight: 106 kg (234 lb)

Career information
- High school: St. Bernard's College (Lower Hutt, New Zealand); Wellington (Wellington, New Zealand)
- College: Winthrop (2003–2007)
- NBA draft: 2007: undrafted
- Playing career: 2002–2012
- Position: Power forward / center

Career history
- 2002–2003: Wellington Saints
- 2007–2008: Brisbane Bullets
- 2008: Efes Pilsen
- 2008–2009: Grupo Begar León
- 2009: Changwon LG Sakers
- 2009–2010: Gold Coast Blaze
- 2010: VEF Rīga
- 2011: Otago Nuggets
- 2012: Southland Sharks

Career highlights
- First-team All-Big South (2007); Big South tournament MVP (2007)

Craig Robert Bradshaw (born 28 July 1983) is a New Zealand former professional basketball player. Bradshaw played four years of college basketball at Winthrop University in the United States before playing professionally with clubs in New Zealand, Australia, Turkey, Spain, South Korea and Latvia from 2007 to 2012.

== Early life ==
Bradshaw grew up in Stokes Valley and was a promising rugby union player. He was noticed for his basketball talent at St. Bernard's College in Lower Hutt and spent his last two years of high school at Wellington High School, where he focused solely on basketball. In 2001, he played for the Wellington College Saints in the Conference Basketball League (CBL) and helped the team reach the final. He was named to the CBL Finals All-Star Five. In 2002 and 2003, he played in the New Zealand NBL for the Wellington Saints. In 13 games for the Saints over two seasons, he averaged 3.8 points and 2.8 rebounds per game.

== College career ==
Bradshaw played four seasons of college basketball for Winthrop University in the United States between 2003 and 2007, where he averaged 9.2 points and 4.7 rebounds in 123 games (104 starts). During that time, the Eagles played in three NCAA tournaments and won three Big South Conference championships. As a junior and senior, he was named to the Big South Conference All-Tournament Team, while also earning Tournament MVP and first-team All-Big South as a senior.

== Professional career ==
=== Atlanta Hawks (2007) ===
After going undrafted in the 2007 NBA draft, Bradshaw joined the Atlanta Hawks for the NBA Summer League tournament in Salt Lake City. In five games for the Hawks, he averaged 4.4 points and 1.8 rebounds in 10.0 minutes per game.

=== Brisbane Bullets (2007–2008) ===
Following his stint with the Atlanta Hawks, Bradshaw joined the Brisbane Bullets for the 2007–08 NBL season. In 30 games for the Bullets, he averaged 13.5 points and 5.7 rebounds per game.

=== Efes Pilsen (2008) ===
In March 2008, Bradshaw signed with Turkish team Efes Pilsen for the rest of the season. In six games for Efes, he averaged 6.2 points and 3.3 rebounds in 15.8 minutes per game.

=== Grupo Begar León (2008–2009) ===
In August 2008, Bradshaw signed with Spanish team Grupo Begar León. In 34 games for León in 2008–09, he averaged 9.4 points and 5.1 rebounds per game.

=== 2009–10 season ===
In August 2009, Bradshaw joined Korean team Changwon LG Sakers. In December 2009, he left Changwon and returned to Australia, signing with the Gold Coast Blaze as an injury replacement for Pero Cameron. He spent the remainder of the 2009–10 NBL season with the Blaze, helping them reach the semi-finals where they were swept 2–0 by the Perth Wildcats.

On 12 March 2010, Bradshaw signed with Latvian team VEF Rīga. However, on 3 May 2010, he parted ways with Rīga after sustaining a season-ending leg injury.

=== New Zealand (2011–2012) ===
On 23 December 2010, Bradshaw with the Otago Nuggets for the 2011 New Zealand NBL season, returning to the league for the first time since 2003. He appeared in all 16 games for the Nuggets in 2011, averaging 18.5 points, 8.5 rebounds and 2.4 assists per game.

On 28 October 2011, Bradshaw signed with the Southland Sharks for the 2012 New Zealand NBL season. He appeared in all 16 games for the Sharks in 2012, averaging 17.1 points, 5.4 rebounds and 1.1 assists per game.

== National team career ==
Bradshaw represented New Zealand with the Tall Blacks at the 2004 Summer Olympics, 2005 FIBA Oceania Championship, 2006 FIBA World Championship, 2007 FIBA Oceania Championship, 2008 Summer Olympics, and the 2010 FIBA World Championship. Bradshaw put his name up in bright lights in 2006 when he scored 25 points to help lead the Tall Blacks to their first away win over Australia.

== Personal life ==
In 2012, Bradshaw married Felicity Kenny. The couple have one daughter together.

Bradshaw has an entrepreneurship degree and set up his own travel management company, New Zealand Specialty Tours, which specialises in developing custom-built itineraries for visitors to New Zealand.

In October 2016, Bradshaw was ordered to pay a $750 emotional harm fee after he was convicted of kicking a bouncer in the head at a Queenstown bar on 13 June 2014. He was sentenced on one charge of assault with intent to injure and, as well as the emotional harm payment, was ordered to pay a $500 fine along with courts costs. In March 2017, he had an appeal against his assault conviction thrown out. Bradshaw appealed against a conviction of assault with intent to injure, based on "undue delay" in the court process, errors in the way the trial proceeded and the refusal of a discharge without conviction.
