= Jack Leasure =

American basketball player

Personal information
- Born: January 29, 1986 (age 40) Rochester, New York, U.S.
- Listed height: 6 ft 3 in (1.91 m)
- Listed weight: 185 lb (84 kg)

Career information
- High school: McQuaid Jesuit (Rochester, New York)
- College: Coastal Carolina (2004–2008)
- NBA draft: 2008: undrafted
- Playing career: 2008–2013
- Position: Shooting guard / point guard
- Coaching career: 2013–2024

Career history

Playing
- 2009: Kelag Wörthersee Piraten
- 2010–2011: Taranaki Mountainairs
- 2011–2012: South Carolina Warriors
- 2012–2013: Taranaki Mountainairs

Coaching
- 2013–2024: McQuaid Jesuit HS

Career highlights
- NBL scoring champion (2011); AP Honorable mention All-American (2006); Big South Player of the Year (2006); 2× First-team All-Big South (2006, 2008); Second-team All-Big South (2007); Big South Freshman of the Year (2005); Big South All-Freshman Team (2005)

John Richard "Jack" Leasure (born January 29, 1986) is an American former professional basketball player who spent the majority of his career playing in the New Zealand National Basketball League for the Taranaki Mountainairs. He is best known for his collegiate career at Coastal Carolina University in which he was named the 2006 Big South Conference Player of the Year and finished with 411 made three-point field goals, which was the fifth-highest NCAA Division I total at the time of his graduation in 2008.

== High school career ==
Leasure attended McQuaid Jesuit High School in Rochester, New York, where he was a member of the 2003 NYSPHSAA Championship team. As a strong student academically as well as athletically, Leasure figured he would end up playing for either an Ivy League or Patriot League basketball program. He caught the attention of Coastal Carolina assistant coach Jamie Kachmarik in the 2002 Beach Ball Classic; Leasure had a strong showing while leading McQuaid Jesuit to a surprising tournament championship. Shortly thereafter, the Big South Conference school offered him a scholarship, which he accepted.

== College career ==
Leasure began his career as a Chanticleer in 2004–05. In one game against Winthrop, Leasure connected on 5-of-10 three-pointers en route to 24 points as the Chanticleers handed them their only conference loss of the season. He began to establish himself as a top three-point shooter and he was named the Big South's Freshman of the Year. He was also named the conference's freshman of the week a record six times that season.

In 2005–06, Leasure had a breakout year in which he averaged a career-high 17.8 points per game, led the team to a 20–10 overall record as they tied for second place in the conference, was second in NCAA Division I with 4.17 made threes per game, was named the Big South's Scholar Athlete of the Year as well as its Men's Basketball Player of the Year (the first time a player won both awards in the same season), and was named an Honorable Mention All-American by the Associated Press. His 125 made three-pointers set school and conference single season records as well.

The personal and team successes experienced during his sophomore year did not reach the same level in Leasure's final two seasons. In 2006–07, Coastal Carolina finished fourth in the conference with a 15–15 overall record (7–7 in Big South). Leasure was named a Second Team All-Conference performer after averaging 15.6 points per game, which was seventh best in the league, while also dishing out 108 total assists, good for tenth in the Big South. For the second year in a row, Leasure was named the conference's Scholar Athlete of the Year. The next season, Leasure's last as a Chanticleer, he led the Big South with made three-pointers (111) and attempted (269). His 16.8 points per game was good for fourth in the league, but the team only finished in fifth place. Leasure returned to the All-Conference First Team, and he finished his collegiate career with 411 made three-pointers, which was the fifth-highest in Division I history at the time of his graduation. Leasure was also a finalist for the Lowe's Senior CLASS Award, which is presented each year to the outstanding senior NCAA Division I Student-Athlete of the Year.

== Professional career ==
Leasure went undrafted in the 2008 NBA draft following his days at Coastal Carolina University. That summer he had an opportunity to try out for the Charlotte Bobcats training camp but he did not make the final cut. He later signed with the Rochester Razorsharks but left after pre-season. In January 2009, he signed with Kelag Wörthersee Piraten of Austria for the rest of the 2008–09 season, where he averaged 14.8 points, 2.9 rebounds, 2.3 assists and 1.1 steals per game.

In the summer of 2009, he re-joined the Rochester Razorsharks but he again left the team after pre-season. In January 2010, he signed with the Taranaki Mountainairs for the 2010 New Zealand NBL season. In September 2010, he re-signed with the Mountainairs for the 2011 season.

In the fall of 2011, he joined the South Carolina Warriors of the American Basketball Association. Leasure's stint in the ABA was short-lived, however, as he left the team in January 2012 after competing in only eight games. He then returned to the Taranaki Mountainairs for the 2012 and 2013 seasons.

In March 2014, it was announced that Leasure would not return to the Mountainairs for the 2014 season due to his coaching commitments at McQuaid Jesuit.

== Coaching career ==
In June 2013, Leasure was named the head coach of McQuaid Jesuit High School basketball team, returning to the school from which he graduated in 2004. He coached the team at the Beach Ball Classic in December 2016. He remained in the position of head coach of McQuaid Jesuit until stepping down at the end of the 2023–24 season.

== See also ==
- List of NCAA Division I men's basketball career 3-point scoring leaders
