= Col. Zadok Magruder High School =

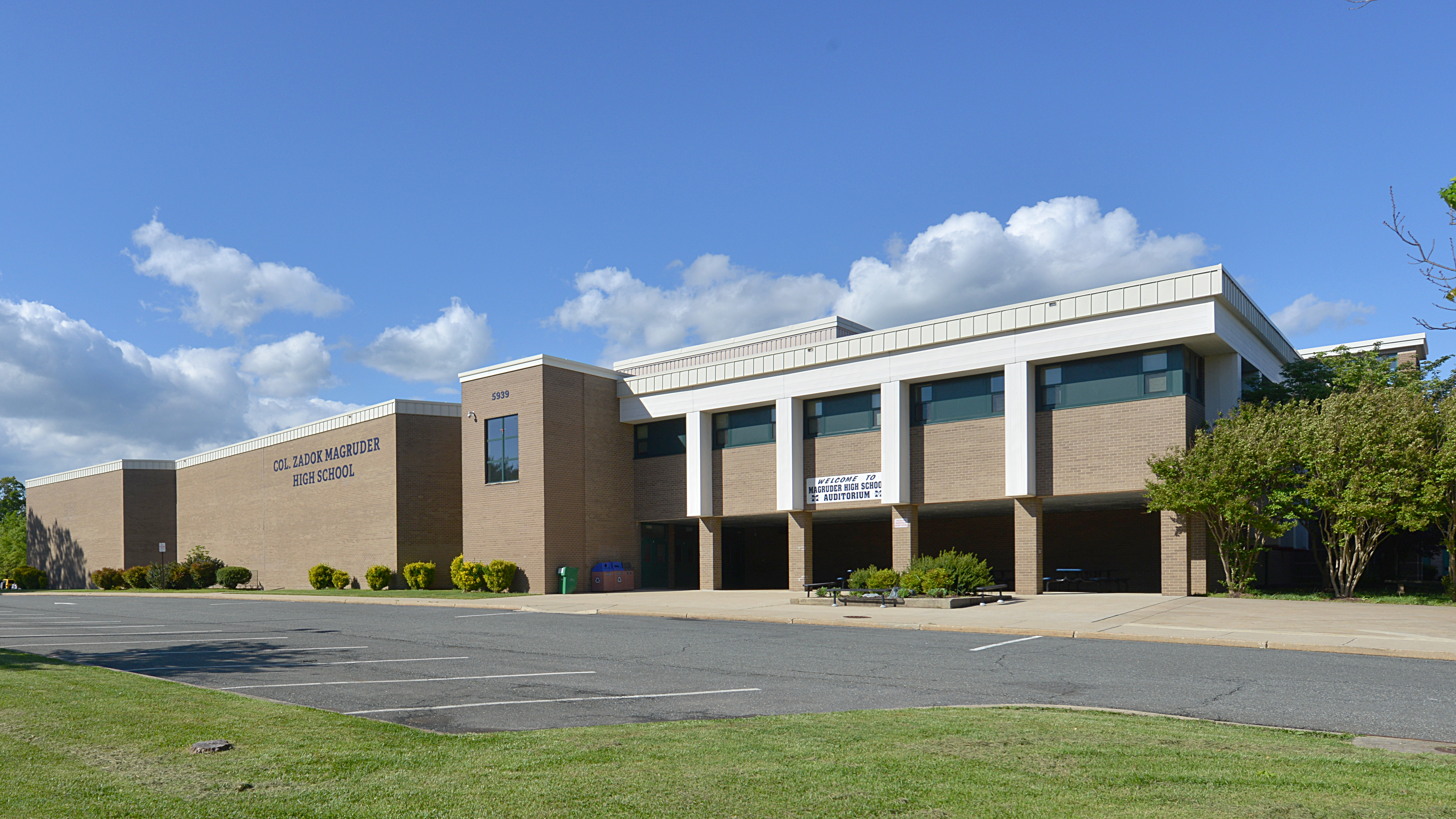

Location
- 5939 Muncaster Mill Road; Rockville, Maryland 20855; United States; 39°07′53″N 77°07′06″W

Information
- Type: Public secondary
- Motto: Connect. Achieve. Excel.
- Established: 1970
- School district: Montgomery County Public Schools
- Principal: Christopher J (Chris) Ascienzo
- Teaching staff: 109.40 (on an FTE basis)
- Grades: 9-12
- Enrollment: 1,686 (2022-2023)
- Student to teacher ratio: 15.41
- Campus: Suburban
- Colors: Blue and grey
- Nickname: Colonels
- Newspaper: The Magruder Messenger
- Yearbook: The Liberator
- Website: www2.montgomeryschoolsmd.org/schools/magruderhs/

Col. Zadok Magruder High School (#510) is a secondary public school located in unincorporated Montgomery County, Maryland, near Redland.

Magruder is named for Colonel Zadok Magruder, a Revolutionary War patriot and farmer. He was colonel in command of part of the Maryland militia and helped establish Montgomery County's government in 1776. The school is called simply "Magruder".

The school first opened in 1970 at 149,533 sq ft (13,892 m^{2}), with 8th, 9th and 10th graders. In 1971, the same student body became 9th, 10th and 11th graders. The first graduating class was the Class of 1973 and numbered approximately 300.

Major additions were added in 1974 (69,000 sq ft (6,400 m^{2})), 1994 (47,151 sq ft (4,380 m^{2})), and 2000 (31,178 sq ft (2,897 m^{2}) of additions, 10,519 sq ft (977 m^{2}) of renovation of the 1994 addition, and demolition of 1,384 sq ft (129 m^{2}) of the 1994 addition). The building now totals 295,478 sq ft (27,451 m^{2}).

Magruder has an International Studies Partnership with Hage Geingob High School in Windhoek, Namibia.

== Areas Served ==
Magruder serves students living in Rockville, Gaithersburg, Derwood, and Redland. It feeds from two middle schools and six elementary schools:

- Redland Middle School
  - Cashell ES
  - Judith A. Resnik ES
  - Sequoyah ES
- Shady Grove Middle School
  - Candlewood ES
  - Flower Hill ES
  - Mill Creek Towne ES

== Academics ==
Magruder students average a score of 1008 on the SAT, averaging 513 on the verbal section and 496 on the math section.

As of 2024, Magruder is the 48th-ranked high school in Maryland and the 2603rd-ranked nationwide, according to U.S News and World Report.

== Athletics ==
- 2001 - Maryland 4A Boys Basketball State Champions
- 2004 - Maryland 4A Girls Volleyball State Finalists (22-3 record); ranked #4 by the Washington Post
- 2007 - Maryland 4A Boys Basketball Regional Champions and State Finalists
- 2007 - Maryland 4A Boys Soccer Regional and State Champions; went undefeated at 19–0; ranked in the Top 10 in the nation.
- 2008 - Girls Metros Diving Champion Brittany Powell
- 2009 - Girls Metros Diving Champion Brittany Powell
- 2009 - Maryland 4A Girls Volleyball State Finalists (24-1 record); ranked #7 by the Washington Post, #1 by the Gazette
- 2010 - Maryland 4A West Field Hockey Regional Champions
- 2010 - Maryland 4A Boys Soccer State Champions; ranked 7th in the DC Metro Area
- 2014 - Maryland 4A Girls Outdoor Track & Field State Champions
- 2024 - Maryland 3A Baseball State Champions

== Notable alumni ==
- Chris Carmack, actor
- Sarah Cooper, comedian
- Dan Hellie, sports broadcaster
- Kelela, singer
- Jason Kravits, actor
- Courtney Kupets, Olympic gymnast
- Helen Maroulis, Olympic wrestler
- Sabastian V. Niles, Chief Legal Officer, Salesforce
- Pele Paelay, professional basketball player
- John Stabb, singer
- Milt Thompson, Major League Baseball player and coach
- Jerome Williams, National Basketball Association (NBA) basketball player
