= Fred McKinnon =

American basketball player

Personal information
- Born: 1960s
- Listed height: 6 ft 6 in (1.98 m)
- Listed weight: 185 lb (84 kg)

Career information
- High school: Crystal River (Crystal River, Florida)
- College: Florida College (1982–1983); Winthrop (1983–1986)
- NBA draft: 1986: undrafted
- Position: Forward

Career highlights
- Big South Player of the Year (1986); First Team All-Big South (1986); NAIA Honorable Mention All-American (1985)

Fred McKinnon (born 1960s) is an American former basketball player. He is known for being the Big South Conference's first ever Men's Basketball Player of the Year in 1985–86.

McKinnon, a 6'6" forward from Crystal River, Florida, played one year of junior college basketball at Florida College before transferring to Winthrop University in 1983. In his senior year in 1985–86, McKinnon averaged 21.1 points per game to lead all Big South players.

Through the 2012–13 season, McKinnon holds the Big South Conference record for field goals made in a game with 20. He is also tied for second for most field goal attempts in a single game with 31. For his career, McKinnon finished with 1,427 points.
