= Demario Beck =

American basketball player (born 1994)

No. 20 – Surrey Scorchers
- Position: Power forward
- League: British Basketball League

Personal information
- Born: 1994 (age 31–32) Cochran, Georgia, U.S.
- Listed height: 6 ft 8 in (2.03 m)
- Listed weight: 220 lb (100 kg)

Career information
- High school: Bleckley County (Cochran, Georgia)
- College: South Georgia Technical (2014–2016); Coastal Carolina (2016–2018)
- NBA draft: 2018: undrafted
- Playing career: 2018–present

Career history
- 2018–present: Surrey Scorchers

Career highlights
- First-team All-GCAA (2016)

Demario Beck (born 1994) is an American professional basketball player for the Surrey Scorchers in the British Basketball League.

== College career ==
Beck spent two years playing at South Georgia Technical College and was named first-team All-GCAA in his sophomore year. He was the team's highest scorer averaging 11.0 points per game over 25 games, and leading rebounder with an average of 9.8 per game.

In 2016, he joined Coastal Carolina University for his junior year. He averaged 10.0 points, 0.6 assists, 7.8 rebounds and 0.6 steals per game in the 2016–17 season, and 9.8 points, 0.7 assists, 7.2 rebounds and 0.5 steals per game in the 2017–18 season.

== Professional career ==
After graduating from Coastal Carolina University, Beck went undrafted in the 2018 NBA draft. In August 2018, he joined British Basketball League team the Surrey Scorchers.
