= Josh Pittman =

American professional basketball player

Personal information
- Born: July 14, 1976 (age 50) Winston-Salem, North Carolina, U.S.
- Listed height: 6 ft 6 in (1.98 m)
- Listed weight: 200 lb (91 kg)

Career information
- High school: East Forsyth (Kernersville, North Carolina)
- College: UNC Asheville (1994–1998)
- NBA draft: 1998: undrafted
- Playing career: 1998–2014
- Position: Shooting guard

Career history
- 1998–2002: Peñarol de Mar del Plata
- 2002: Bignami Castlmaggiore
- 2003: Quilmes de Mar del Plata
- 2003–2004: Asociación Deportiva Atenas
- 2005: Gatos de Monagas
- 2005: Peñarol de Mar del Plata
- 2005–2006: Delfines de Miranda
- 2006–2007: Peñarol de Mar del Plata
- 2007: Libertad de Sunchales
- 2008–2009: Halcones UV Córdoba
- 2010–2011: Obras Sanitarias
- 2011–2012: Libertad de Sunchales
- 2012–2014: Juventud Sionista

Career highlights
- Argentine League Top Scorer (2003); 2× Big South Player of the Year (1997, 1998)

Abdul Joshua Pittman (born July 14, 1976) is an American former professional basketball player. He played in numerous countries throughout his career. Pittman played college basketball at University of North Carolina at Asheville, and was named the Big South Conference Men's Basketball Player of the Year twice, in 1997 and 1998. At 6'6" tall, 200-pounds, he played at the shooting guard position. On May 2, 2018 he was named the new head coach for the Lexington Yellow Jackets in the Central Carolina Conference.

== College career ==
Pittman, a native of Winston-Salem, North Carolina, stayed in his home state to play college basketball. He attended UNC Asheville between 1994–95 and 1997–98 after graduating from high school in 1994. Through his first two seasons he only accumulated approximately 400 points and had an otherwise typical college career. Then, in his junior season with the Bulldogs, Pittman averaged 18.4 points, 4.3 rebounds and 1.8 steals per game. The Bulldogs won the regular season Big South Conference championship behind Pittman's league-leading scoring average, which was also the sixth-highest average in school history. In his senior season, he averaged 18.0 points, 4.9 rebounds and 1.9 steals per game. For the first time in UNC Asheville history, the men's basketball team repeated as the regular season conference champions. Consequently, Pittman became just the second Big South player (at the time) to be named the conference player of the year twice. He finished his college career with 1,547 points—the most in the program's history—and his 175 steals were a then-school record as well.

== Professional career ==
Pittman never made it to the National Basketball Association, so he decided to play professionally overseas. From 1998 until December 2001 he played in Argentina for Peñarol de Mar del Plata. He then signed with Italy's Bignami Castelmaggiore in January 2002, for whom he played 18 games. Pittman headed back to Argentina after signing with Quilmes de Mar del Plata. Over the course of the next 10 years, he played for various squads in Argentina, Venezuela and Mexico. In the 2012–13 basketball season, Pittman played for Juventud Sionista in the Liga Nacional de Básquet, Argentina's First Division.

== Achievements ==
- Big South Conference Player of the Year (1997, 1998)
- Big South 1st Team (1998)
- Latinbasket.com Argentine Liga A All-Imports Team (2003, 2004, 2007)
- Argentine League All-Stars Game -04 (MVP) (2005) Argentine MVP (2004) Best Foreign Player (2004)
- Liga Sudamericana Champion (2004)
- Latinbasket.com All-Argentine Liga A 2nd Team (2004)
- Latinbasket.com All-Argentine Liga A 1st Team (2007)
- Argentine Liga A All-Stars Game (2007)
- Argentine Cup Winner (2006)
- Argentine Liga A Regular Season Champion (2007, 2011)
- Argentine Liga A Finalist (2007)
- Latinbasket.com All-Mexican LNBP Honorable Mention (2009)
- Argentine Liga A All-Star Game (2011-2013)
- Big South HOF (2010)
- UNCA HOF (2010
- East Forsyth High School HOF
