= Derek Wilson (basketball) =

American basketball player

Personal information
- Born: March 14, 1967 (age 59)
- Listed height: 6 ft 7 in (2.01 m)

Career information
- College: Coastal Carolina (1985–1989)
- NBA draft: 1989: undrafted
- Position: Power forward / center

Career highlights
- Big South Player of the Year (1989); 2× First Team All-Big South (1988, 1989); Anson Mount Scholar-Athlete of the Year (1989); Honorable Mention All-American (1989)

Derek Lamont Wilson (born March 14, 1967) is an American former professional basketball player. He played four years at Coastal Carolina University (1985–1989) where he scored 1,492 career points. A 6'7" power forward / center, Wilson was named the Big South Conference Player of the Year as a junior in 1987–88. It was the first of two consecutive seasons in which Wilson was named a First Team All-Conference performer. The following year, he was named an honorable mention All-American as well as the 1989 Anson Mount Scholar-Athlete of the Year.

Although he went undrafted in the 1989 NBA draft, he carved out a professional career overseas. He spent some time in Norway playing for Asker Aliens, but the majority of his expatriate career was spent in Luxembourg playing for various clubs (BBC Etzella Ettelbruck, BBC Nitia, Black Star, Bascharage).
