= Tony Dunkin =

American basketball player (born 1970)

Personal information
- Born: February 16, 1970 (age 56) Rains, South Carolina, U.S.
- Listed height: 6 ft 7 in (2.01 m)
- Listed weight: 215 lb (98 kg)

Career information
- College: Coastal Carolina (1989–1993)
- NBA draft: 1993: undrafted
- Playing career: 1993–199?
- Position: Small forward

Career history
- 199?–199?: Fargo-Moorhead Beez
- 199?–199?: Danone-Honvéd BT

Career highlights
- 4× Big South Player of the Year (1990–1993); 4× First-team All-Big South (1990–1993); Big South Rookie of the Year (1990); 2× Big South tournament MVP (1991, 1993); Only Division I men's basketball player to be named conference player of the year all four possible years

Tony Dunkin (born February 16, 1970) is an American former college basketball standout for Coastal Carolina University. He is the only NCAA Division I men's basketball player to be honored as his conference player of the year all four times. (Note: Four Division I women's players have matched this achievement, although two were co-winners on at least one occasion. Lee Eun-jung of Louisiana–Monroe, then known as Northeast Louisiana, was the sole recipient of the Southland Conference award from 1983–1986, and Macee Williams of IUPUI was the sole recipient in the Horizon League from 2019–2022. Kim Smith of Utah received the award in the Mountain West Conference from 2003–2006, twice outright and twice shared. Jantel Lavender of Ohio State received Big Ten Conference honors from 2008–2011. In that conference, two separate awards are presented, one voted on by league coaches and the other by media; Lavender received the coaches' award in 2008, the media award in 2011, and both awards in 2009 and 2010.) In 2003–04 he was part of the inaugural 11-person class inducted into the Big South Conference Hall of Fame.

== College career ==
=== Freshman season ===
In 1989–90, Dunkin was forced to sit out the Coastal Carolina Chanticleers' first five games due to NCAA eligibility rules because he had just transferred from Jacksonville University. In his collegiate debut on December 9, 1989, against Georgia Tech, Dunkin, a forward, scored 22 points on 9-of-15 shooting. He scored a season-high 28 points on February 1, 1990, against Campbell en route to averages of 18.1 points and 6.6 rebounds during his rookie campaign. He led the Chanticleers to the Big South regular-season and tournament championships, garnering numerous accolades in the process. He was named the Big South Player of the Year, the first-ever Big South Rookie of the Year, First Team All-Conference and to the All-Tournament Team.

=== Sophomore season ===
Dunkin was named a preseason honorable mention All-American by Street & Smith's prior to the 1990–91 season. He would set new career highs in most statistical categories while helping Coastal Carolina to repeat as regular-season and conference tournament champions. In 28 games played, Dunkin averaged 18.1 points and 7.1 rebounds to become the first Big South player to win back-to-back player of the year awards. He also was named First Team All-Conference and the Tournament MVP.

1991 NCAA Tournament

The Big South was only in its sixth year of existence when Dunkin was a sophomore. As the conference tournament champion, Coastal Carolina was granted a "play-in" game in order to gain an automatic berth into the 1991 NCAA tournament. They defeated Jackson State 78–59 and became the Big South's first-ever team in the "Big Dance." Coastal Carolina (15th seed) would lose to Indiana (2nd seed) by a score of 69–79. Dunkin was limited to 11 points in the game.

=== Junior season ===
"We have played a lot of good teams this season, including UNC Charlotte, Vanderbilt and Georgia Tech, but Tony Dunkin is by far the best we have faced. I was an assistant for the New Jersey Nets for three years; Tony would have played for us every year. I may have even traded for him if he wasn't on our side."

— CofC head coach John Kresse following a 28-point, 10-rebound performance by Dunkin against CofC

In 1991–92, Dunkin was given a second straight preseason All-American nod. Early in the season, the Chanticleers participated in the Great Alaska Shootout tournament, where Dunkin fell two points shy of setting the tournament's all-time scoring record; his 81 points is second to the record of 83. He was named to the All-Tournament Team for his performance. Due to an injury, Dunkin only played in 21 of the team's 33 games, but he led his team in scoring every game he played in and also reached the 20-point mark 15 times. For the season, he averaged 22.5 points and 8.1 rebounds, leading him to a rare third-consecutive conference player of the year selection. At the time, only 15 other Division I men's basketball players had accomplished that feat.

=== Senior season ===
Going into his final collegiate season in 1992–93, Dunkin was rated as the ninth-best small forward in the country by NCAA Magazine, which also tabbed him as one of the "Most Breathtaking Athletes" in college basketball. Dunkin averaged 23.7 points per game—the highest of his career—and became the first Big South player to score 2,000 career points (his 2,151 was a record that stood for 14 years, until Larry Blair of Liberty surpassed the mark in 2007). He earned his fourth Big South Player of the Year award on March 4, 1993, making him the only Division I men's basketball player to ever earn the distinction for all four seasons.

1993 NCAA Tournament

Dunkin led Coastal Carolina to another Big South tournament championship in 1992–93, which gave the Chanticleers their second berth into the NCAA Tournament in three years. Coastal Carolina was made the 16th seed in the West Region, which pitted them against 1-seed Michigan and its fabled Fab Five. In an 84–53 loss to the eventual national runner-up, Dunkin finished his career by scoring a team-high 17 points.

He was invited to participate in the college Slam Dunk Contest during the Final Four Weekend activities, which made him the first Big South player in the event's history.

== Professional career ==
After college, Dunkin played in the Continental Basketball Association (CBA) for the Fargo-Moorhead Beez and in Hungary for Danone-Honvéd BT.
