= Winthrop Eagles men's basketball =

American college basketball team

| 2025–26 Winthrop Eagles men's basketball team |
- University: Winthrop University
- First season: 1978–79; 48 years ago
- Athletic director: Chuck Rey
- Head coach: Mark Prosser (5th season)
- Location: Rock Hill, South Carolina
- Arena: Winthrop Coliseum (capacity: 6,100)
- Conference: Big South
- Nickname: Eagles
- Colors: Garnet and gold

NCAA Division I tournament round of 32
- 2007

NCAA Division I tournament appearances
- 1999, 2000, 2001, 2002, 2005, 2006, 2007, 2008, 2010, 2017, 2021

Conference tournament champions
- 1988, 1999, 2000, 2001, 2002, 2005, 2006, 2007, 2008, 2010, 2017, 2020, 2021

Conference regular-season champions
- 1999, 2002, 2003, 2005, 2006, 2007, 2008, 2016, 2017, 2020, 2021

Conference division champions
- 2022

Uniforms
| Home | Away | Alternate |

The Winthrop Eagles men's basketball team represents Winthrop University in Rock Hill, South Carolina, United States and competes in the Big South Conference. Winthrop plays their home games in the 6,100 seat Winthrop Coliseum. Winthrop has appeared 11 times in the NCAA tournament, most recently in 2021. The Eagles earned the program's only win ever at the NCAA tournament at the 2007 NCAA tournament, earning a 74-64 upset win over #6 seeded Notre Dame. The Eagles have played 45 seasons of basketball since their inaugural 1978–79 campaign.

== Team history ==
=== Rise to mid-major prominence ===
During the late 1990s and 2000s, Winthrop established itself as one of the most successful mid-major programs in college basketball, reaching the NCAA Tournament eight times in 10 seasons. From 1998 to 2008, the Eagles posted a 216–95 overall record and went 114–28 in Big South play. During this stretch, Winthrop defeated programs from high major conferences like the ACC (Clemson, Georgia Tech, #19 Miami in 2007), Big East (Marquette, #17 Notre Dame in the NCAA tournament, Providence), and SEC (Georgia, Mississippi State). Winthrop also beat Missouri in 2000.

Since 2009, Winthrop has defeated over 30 non-conference D1 teams including: Auburn (SEC), Clemson (ACC), Wake Forest (ACC), East Carolina, East Tennessee State, Furman, Georgia Southern, Illinois (Big 10), James Madison, Manhattan College, Ohio University, #18 Saint Mary's in 2019, St. Louis, UNC Greensboro, Portland, San Diego, Washington (PAC 12), and William & Mary. Winthrop beat the ACC, SEC, PAC 12, and Big 10 schools at the opposing school.

=== Neild Gordon era (1978–1986) ===
Winthrop's first head coach, Neild Gordon, recorded 25 wins and 10 losses in the Eagle's first season. He finished with an average win percentage of .615 and 20 wins per season during his tenure at WU. Gordon was later inducted into Winthrop University's Athletics Hall of Fame, the Furman University Athletic Hall of Fame, the National Association of Intercollegiate Athletics (NAIA) Halls of Fame, and the South Carolina Athletic Hall of Fame.

=== Steve Vacendak era (1986–1992) ===
Former Duke point guard and ACC Player of the Year, Steve Vacendak coached the Eagles from 1986 to 1992. In Winthrop's second season as a Division I program, he led the 4th seeded eagles to their first Big South tournament victory.

=== Dan Kenney era (1993–1998) ===
Dan Kenney was the head coach of the Eagles during the mid-1990s and finished his tenure with a record of 51-113. WU athletic director Tom Hickman reportedly said that Kenney "graduated his players, ran a clean, upstanding program and did everything first class but had to be relieved of his coaching duties because the school could no longer carry his losing record."

=== Gregg Marshall era (1998–2007) ===
Gregg Marshall coached the Eagles from 1998 to 2007, engineering one of the great program turnarounds in NCAA history. In just his first season at the helm, he led the Eagles to a 21–8 record and an appearance in the 1999 Men's Division 1 Tournament. This success continued as his team would go on to make the Tournament in each of the next three seasons, establishing a winning tradition that would last into the 2010s. Overall, he posted a 194–83 overall record during his nine-year tenure. Marshall led the Eagles to a 104–24 conference record, six Big South season titles, and seven Big South tournament titles. Winthrop appeared in seven NCAA Tournaments, posted six 20-win seasons, and averaged 21.5 victories per year during the Marshall Era. In April 2007, Marshall left Winthrop to become the head coach at Wichita State.

=== Randy Peele era (2007–2012) ===
Randy Peele posted a 77–82 overall record (48–38 Big South) as head coach from 2007 to 2012. He led the Eagles to one Big South season title and two Big South tournament titles. Winthrop appeared in two NCAA Tournaments and notched one 20-win season under Peele's leadership. Randy Peele was relieved of his coaching duties at Winthrop on March 5, 2012.

=== Pat Kelsey era (2012–2021) ===
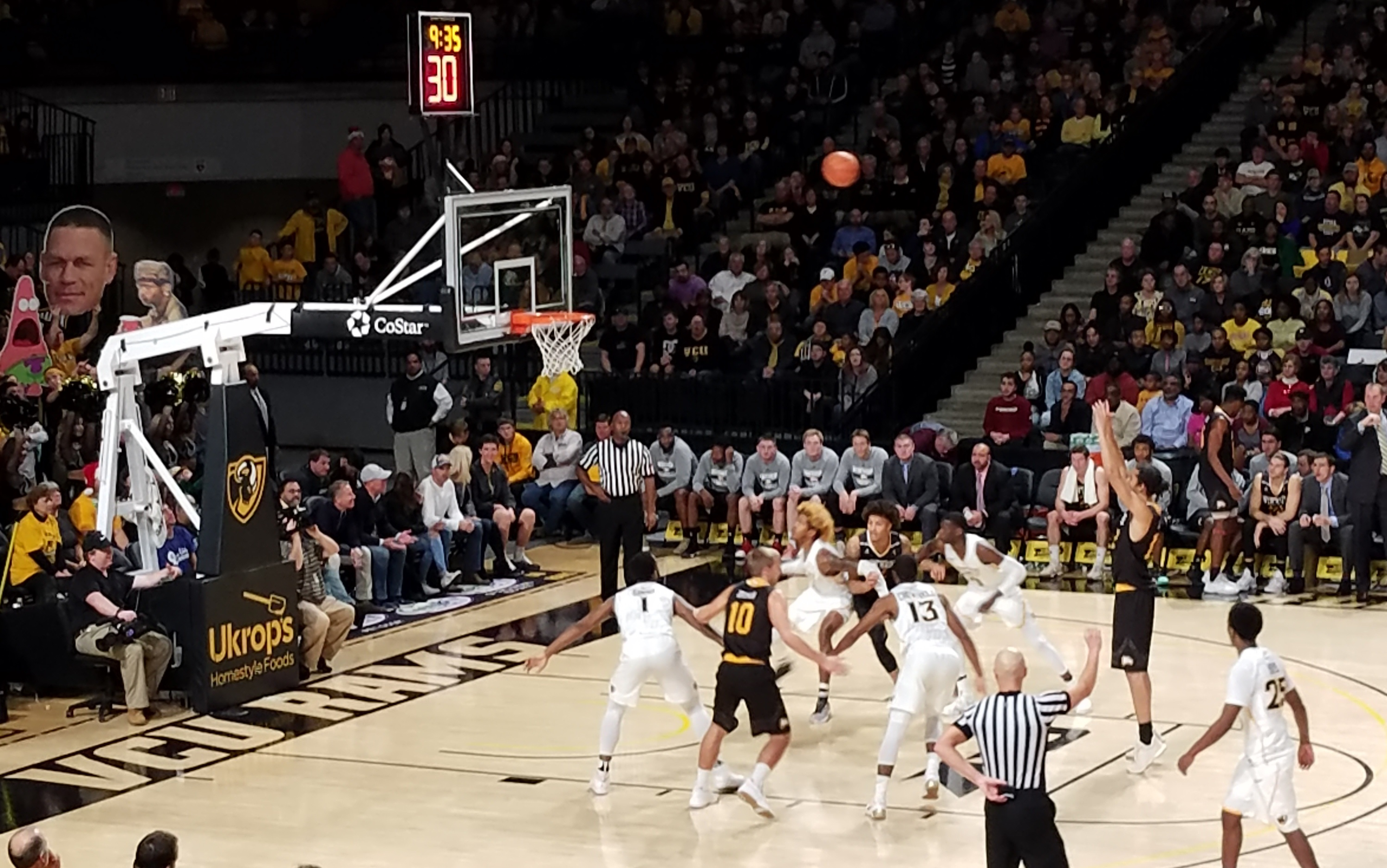
Xavier Cooks shooting a free throw against VCU (2017)

Former Xavier and Wake Forest assistant Pat Kelsey was announced as Winthrop's new coach on March 29, 2012. Over nine seasons with the Eagles, Kelsey went 186–95 (.662) overall and 110–46 (.705) in the Big South and led Winthrop to three Big South season championships (2016, 2017, 2021), three Big South tournament championships (2017, 2020, 2021), and three Big South Tournament runner-up finishes (2014, 2015, 2016). In 2020–21, Kelsey's last season with the team, the Eagles went nearly undefeated, finishing 23-2, and led the Big South in assists, steals, points per game, scoring margin, offensive rebounds, defensive rebounds, and rebounding offense.

Under Kelsey, the Eagles' style of play exhibited a fast-paced, high scoring offense and pack line defense. Kelsey's Eagles broke multiple school records in categories such as free throw accuracy, blocked shots, three-pointers made, offensive pace, and points scored in a single game. With the help of assistant coaches like Brian Kloman, Kelsey developed a successful local and international recruiting pipeline and signed some of the top players in WU's history. This includes Winthrop's all-time leading rebounder and shot-blocker, Xavier Cooks, and Winthrop's all-time leading scorer, Keon Johnson. Kelsey's program signed D2 transfer Chandler Vaudrin, the then college national leader in triple-doubles and D. J. Burns, an ESPN 4-star recruit and transfer from the University of Tennessee. In March 2021, Kelsey left Winthrop to become the head coach at the College of Charleston.

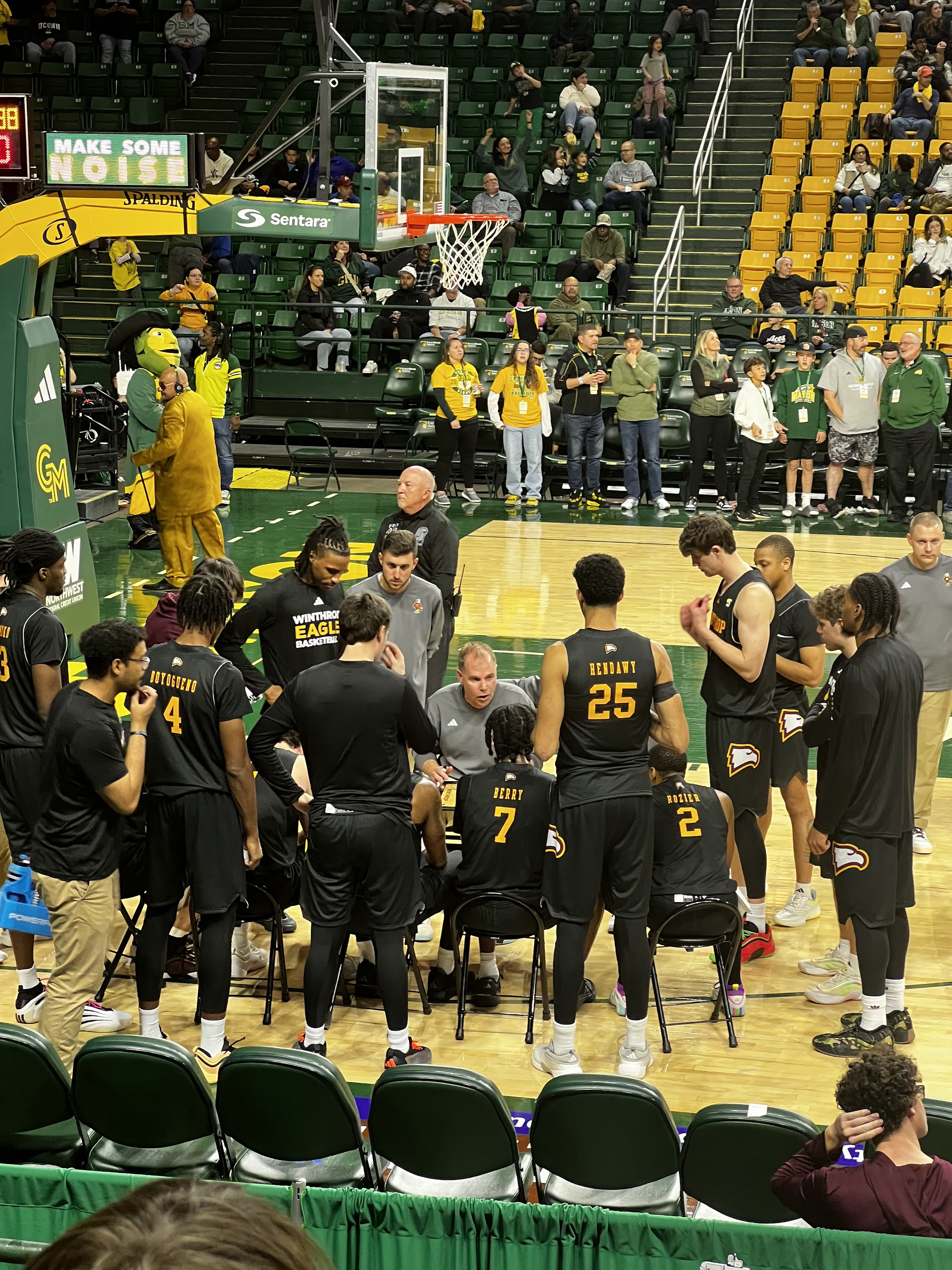
Winthrop team huddle in an away game against George Mason University (2025)

=== Mark Prosser era (2021–present) ===
In April 2021, Mark Prosser, former Winthrop assistant and son of Skip Prosser, returned to take the head coach position vacated by Pat Kelsey. Six games into his first season, the Eagles beat the University of Washington to notch Prosser's first win as head coach at WU against a Power 5 conference and Winthrop's first win ever against a PAC-12 team. Additionally, the 2021-2022 team went undefeated at home (13–0) and finished first in the Big South Conference South Division.

The 2022-2023 Eagles finished with a record of 15–17, which was Winthrop's first losing season in a decade. Many attributed the poor record to multiple players being injured throughout the season. In Prosser's third season (2023-2024), the Eagles lost by 10 points or less (in road games) to three Power 5 teams (i.e., South Carolina, Georgia, and Florida State) in the non-conference portion of the season. They finished with a 17–15 record and lost to Longwood in the first round of the Big South Tournament. The #5 seeded Lancers went on to win the Big South Championship. In 2024-2025, Prosser's Eagles finished 23-11. They played in the Big South Conference Championship game and, although having a double digit lead at halftime (39-29), lost to High Point 81-69. In 2025-2026, Winthrop had another strong season finishing 23-11 and again playing in the Big South title game and losing to High Point. Two of the most significant games of the season were a 92-75 win over High Point at home and a 1 point loss to a #21 Arkansas at Arkansas.

== 2007 Season: Top 25 and Round of 32 ==
Winthrop's greatest success to date was in 2007, as it went 29–5 under Coach Marshall and finished #22 nationally in both the AP and Coaches' Final Polls. The Eagles posted a perfect 14–0 mark in conference play, winning the Big South regular season championship. Notable regular season non-conference victories included wins against Mississippi State and Old Dominion. Each of Winthrop's four regular season losses came at the hand of a Top 25 opponent, with two of the games decided by single-digit margins. They lost to the #2 program in the country (UNC) by seven points.

After winning the Big South Tournament, the Eagles were given a #11 seed in the NCAA Tournament and a First Round matchup against #6 seed Notre Dame. On March 16, 2007 (day before St. Patrick's Day), Winthrop defeated the Irish by a score of 74–64, becoming the first Big South men's basketball team to win an NCAA Tournament First Round game. In the Round of 32, the Eagles lost to #3 seed Oregon by a score of 75–61 to close out their season.

== Postseason ==
=== NCAA tournament results ===
Winthrop has appeared in 11 NCAA Tournaments and has a combined record of 1–11. The Eagles advanced to the Round of 32 in 2007, the only Big South team ever to do so.

| Year | Seed | Round | Opponent | Result |
|---|---|---|---|---|
| 1999 | #16 | First Round | #1 Auburn | L 41–80 |
| 2000 | #14 | First Round | #3 Oklahoma | L 50–74 |
| 2001 | #16 | Opening Round | #16 Northwestern State | L 67–71 |
| 2002 | #16 | First Round | #1 Duke | L 37–84 |
| 2005 | #14 | First Round | #3 Gonzaga | L 64–74 |
| 2006 | #15 | First Round | #2 Tennessee | L 61–63 |
| 2007 | #11 | First Round; Second Round | #6 Notre Dame #3 Oregon | W 74–64; L 61–75 |
| 2008 | #13 | First Round | #4 Washington State | L 40–71 |
| 2010 | #16 | Opening Round | #16 Arkansas–Pine Bluff | L 44–61 |
| 2017 | #13 | First Round | #4 Butler | L 64–76 |
| 2021 | #12 | First Round | #5 Villanova | L 63–73 |

== Conference Championships ==
- 1988 Big South (tourney) – Winthrop went 17–13 overall and won the Big South Tournament.
- 1999 Big South (season & tourney) – Winthrop went 21–8 overall and 9–1 in Big South.
- 2000 Big South (tourney) – Winthrop went 21–9 overall and 11–3 in Big South.
- 2001 Big South (tourney) – Winthrop went 18–13 overall and 11–3 in Big South.
- 2002 Big South (season & tourney) – Winthrop went 19–12 overall and 10–4 in Big South.
- 2003 Big South (season) – Winthrop went 20–10 overall and 11–3 in Big South.
- 2005 Big South (season & tourney) – Winthrop went 27–6 overall and 15–1 in Big South.
- 2006 Big South (season & tourney) – Winthrop went 23–8 overall and 13–3 in Big South.
- 2007 Big South (season & tourney) – Winthrop went 29–5 overall and 14–0 in Big South.
- 2008 Big South (season & tourney) – Winthrop went 22–12 overall and 10–4 in Big South.
- 2010 Big South (tourney) – Winthrop went 19–14 overall and 12–6 in Big South.
- 2016 Big South (season) – Winthrop went 23–9 overall and 13–5 in Big South.
- 2017 Big South (season & tourney) – Winthrop went 26–6 overall and 15–3 in Big South.
- 2020 Big South (season & tourney) – Winthrop went 24–10 overall and 15–3 in Big South.
- 2021 Big South (season & tourney) – Winthrop went 23–2 overall and 17–1 in Big South.
- 2022 Big South (division) – Winthrop went 23–9 overall and 16–2 in Big South.

== Facilities ==
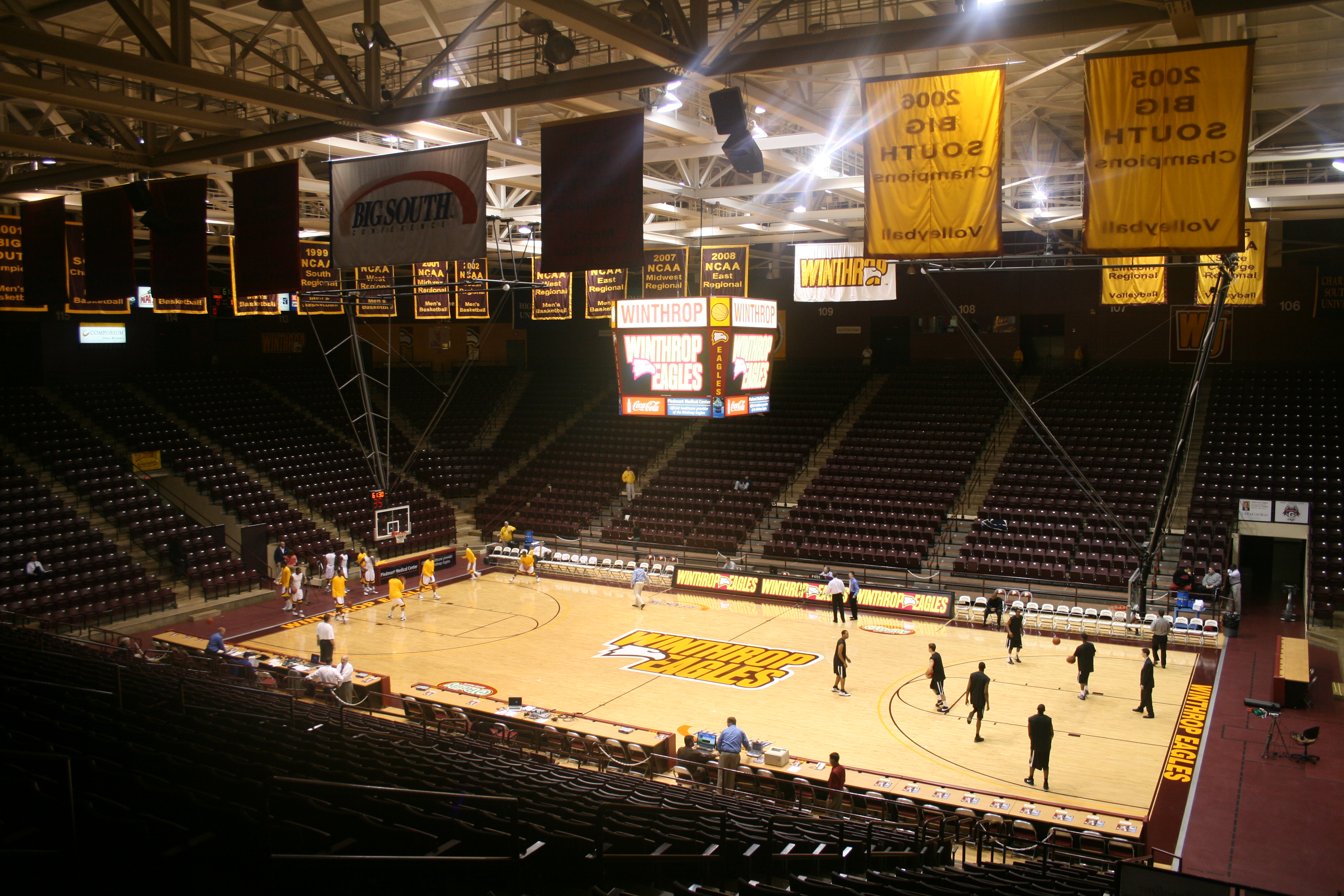
Winthrop Coliseum

Winthrop Coliseum (1982–present): 6,100-seat multi-purpose arena in Rock Hill, South Carolina.

== Player awards ==
=== Big South Men's Basketball Player of the Year ===
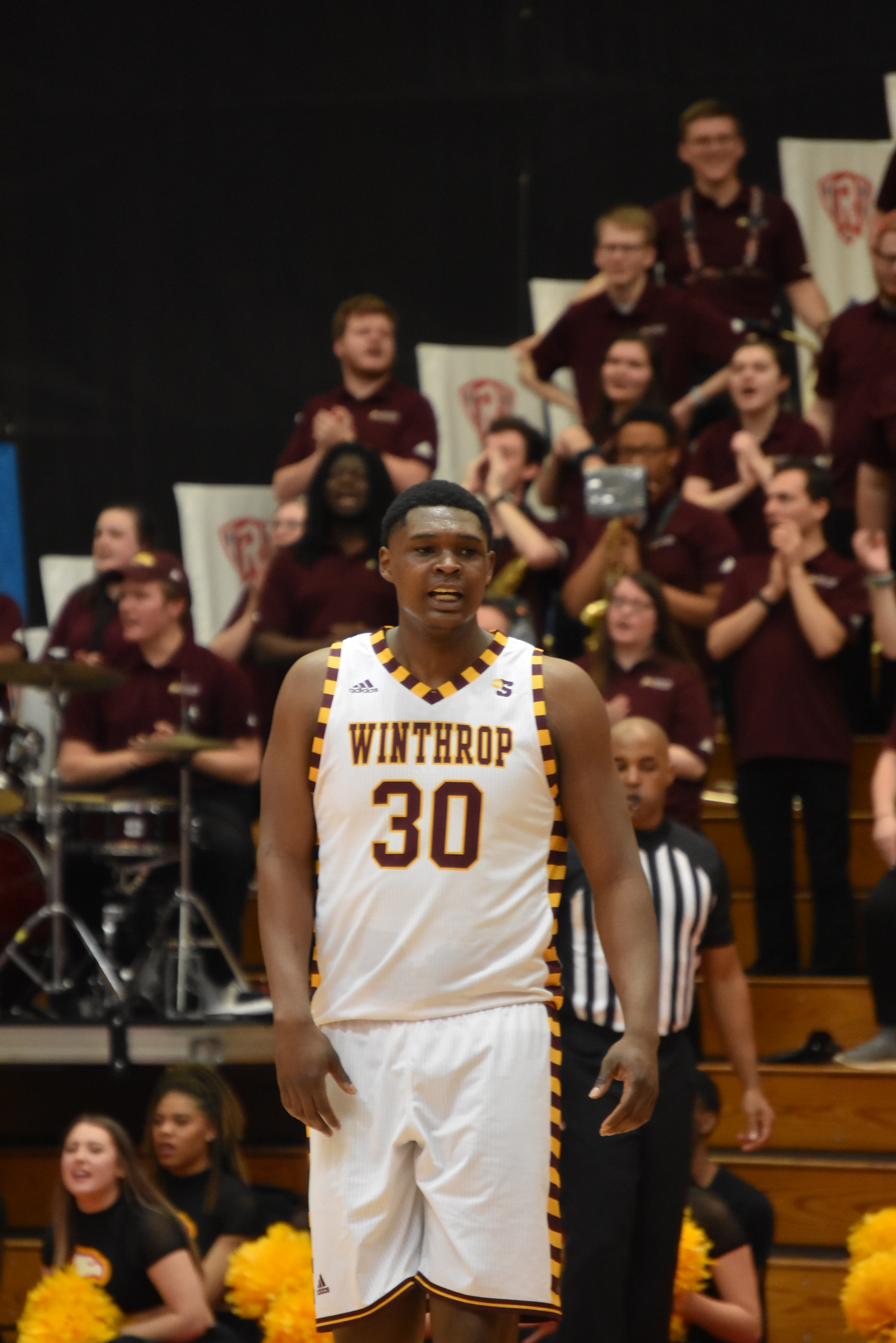
Winthrop Big Man, D. J. Burns, on the floor at the Dedmon Center during the 2020 Big South Quarter Final Game with USC-Upstate.

- Fred McKinnon (1986)
- Greg Lewis (2002)
- Keon Johnson (2017)
- Xavier Cooks (2018)
- Chandler Vaudrin (2021)
- D. J. Burns (2022)
- Logan Duncomb (2026)

=== Big South Men's Basketball Freshman of the Year ===
- Tyson Waterman (1996)
- Tyrone Walker (2001)
- D. J. Burns (2020)

=== Big South Men's Basketball Defensive Player of the Year ===
- Mantoris Robinson (2009 & 2010)

=== Big South Men's Basketball All-Decade Team (2010-2019) ===
- Keon Johnson (2017)
- Xavier Cooks (2018)

=== Kyle Macy Freshman All-America Award ===
- D. J. Burns (2020)

=== National Association of Basketball Coaches (NABC) All District DI Teams ===
- First Team (District 3) - Chandler Vaudrin (2021)
- Second Team (District 3) - Kelton Talford (2024)

== NCAA (DI) Season Statistical Leaders ==
- 2006-07 - James Shuler made 18 out of 18 free-throws in a single game to lead the nation in highest single game free-throw percentage.
- 2007-08 - Michael Jenkins made 12 three-point shots in a single game to lead the nation in most three-point field goals made in a single game.
- 2018-19 - Winthrop averaged 12.4 made threes to lead the nation in three-point field goals per game.
- 2019-20 - Chase Claxton shot 81.2% to lead the nation in two-point shooting average.
- 2019-20 - Winthrop had 1388 rebounds to lead the nation in total rebounds.
- 2020-21 - Chandler Vaudrin led the nation in triple-doubles at 3 in total.
- 2023-24 - Winthrop led the nation in free throw attempts per game.

== NBA Players ==
- Xavier Cooks - Washington Wizards (2023 - 2023)

== NBA Summer League Players ==
- Pierre Wooten - Denver Nuggets, Charlotte Bobcats, and New Orleans Hornets
- Michael Jenkins - Brooklyn Nets (2014)
- Jimmy Gavin - Orlando Magic (2016)
- Xavier Cooks - Golden State Warriors (2018), Phoenix Suns (2019)
- Chandler Vaudrin - Cleveland Cavaliers (2022), Dallas Mavericks (2023)
- Adonis Arms - Denver Nuggets (2022), Brooklyn Nets (2023), Sacramento Kings (2024), and Houston Rockets (2025)
- Hunter Hale - Phoenix Suns (2023)
- DJ Burns Jr. - Cleveland Cavaliers (2024)

== FIBA World Cup Players ==
- Craig Bradshaw - New Zealand (2006)
- Xavier Cooks - Australia (2019). Cooks made the Australian Boomers team but did not compete in the 2019 World Cup due to an injury.

== Olympians ==
- Craig Bradshaw, power-forward and center for the Eagles from 2003 to 2007, played with New Zealand in the 2004 and 2008 Olympic games.
- Xavier Cooks was named as one of three replacement players for the Australian Boomers team for the 2020 Tokyo Olympics.
