= Coastal Carolina Chanticleers men's basketball =

College basketball team

2026–27 Coastal Carolina Chanticleers men's basketball team
- University: Coastal Carolina University
- Head coach: Justin Gray (3rd season)
- Location: Conway, South Carolina
- Arena: HTC Center (capacity: 3,600)
- Conference: Sun Belt Conference
- Nickname: Chanticleers
- Colors: Teal, bronze, and black

NCAA Division I tournament appearances
- 1991, 1993, 2014, 2015

Conference tournament champions
- 1990, 1991, 1993, 2014, 2015

Conference regular-season champions
- 1988, 1989, 1990, 1991, 1993, 2010, 2011, 2014

Conference division champions
- 2021

Uniforms
Home	Away	Alternate

The Coastal Carolina Chanticleers men's basketball team is the men's basketball team that represents Coastal Carolina University in Conway, South Carolina, United States. The school's team currently competes in the Sun Belt Conference. Tony Dunkin, a former Chanticleer, is the only men's basketball player in NCAA Division I history to be named the conference player of the year all four seasons he played. Coastal Carolina has appeared four times in the NCAA Tournament, most recently in 2015.

== Postseason history ==
Coastal Carolina has competed in the NCAA tournament four times and have a record of 0–4. In 1991, the Chanticleers were a 15-seed and lost 79–69 to Indiana. In 1993, the team was a 16-seed and lost 84–53 to Michigan; Michigan later vacated the victory. The Chanticleers next appeared in 2014, as a 16-seed, losing to first-seed Virginia, 70–59. In 2015, after beating Winthrop 81–70 for the Big South championship, the team made their second consecutive NCAA Tournament appearance. Again a 16-seed, the Chanticleers lost to eventual tournament runner-up Wisconsin, 86–72.

The Chanticleers have also appeared in two National Invitation Tournaments, where they have a record of 0–2, two CollegeInsider.com Postseason Tournaments, where they have a record of 3–2, and one College Basketball Invitational, where they have a record of 4–2.

=== NCAA tournament results ===
Year	Round	Opponent	Result
1991	First Round	(2) Indiana	L 69–79
1993	First Round	(1) Michigan	L 53–84*
2014	First Round	(1) Virginia	L 59–70
2015	First Round	(1) Wisconsin	L 72–86

*Michigan's win later vacated.

=== National Invitation Tournament results ===
Year	Round	Opponent	Result
2010	First Round	(2) UAB	L 49–65
2011	First Round	(1) Alabama	L 44–68

=== CollegeInsider.com Postseason Tournament results ===
Year	Round	Opponent	Result
2012	First Round	Old Dominion	L 66–68
2016	First Round; Second Round; Quarterfinals; Semifinals	Mercer; New Hampshire; Grand Canyon; UC Irvine	W 65–57; W 71–62; W 60–58; L 47–66

=== College Basketball Invitational results ===
The Chanticleers have appeared in the College Basketball Invitational three times. Their combined record is 8–4.

Year	Round	Opponent	Result
2017	First Round; Quarterfinals; Semifinals; Finals–Game 1 Finals–Game 2 Finals–Game 3	Hampton; Loyola (MD); UIC; Wyoming; Wyoming; Wyoming	W 83–67; W 72–63; W 89–78; W 91–81; L 57–81; L 59–83
2019	First Round; Quarterfinals; Semifinals	Howard; West Virginia; DePaul	W 81–72; W 109–91; L 87–92
2021	First Round; Semifinals; Finals	Bryant; Stetson; Pepperdine	W 93–82; W 77-72^{OT} L 61–84

=== The Basketball Classic results ===
The Chanticleers have appeared in The Basketball Classic one time. Their record is 3–1.

Year	Round	Opponent	Result
2022	First Round; Second Round; Semifinals; Championship	Maryland Eastern Shore; Florida Gulf Coast; South Alabama; Fresno State	W 66–42; W 84–68; W 69-68 OT; L 74–85

== Current coaching staff ==
Name	Position
Justin Gray	Head basketball coach
Tim Koenig	Associate head coach
Jason Allison	Assistant coach
Kylen Butler	Assistant coach
Brian Graves	Assistant coach
Mike Brown	Assistant coach / Player Development
Cody Cohen	Director of Basketball Logistics and Scouting
Josh Spainhour	Director of Men's Basketball Performance

== Conference affiliations ==
- Big South Conference (1985–86 to 2015–16)
- Sun Belt Conference (2016–17 to present)
