= Winthrop Eagles men's basketball statistical leaders =

The Winthrop Eagles men's basketball statistical leaders are individual statistical leaders of the Winthrop Eagles men's basketball program in various categories, including points, assists, blocks, rebounds, and steals. Within those areas, the lists identify single-game, single-season, and career leaders. The Eagles represent Winthrop University in the NCAA's Big South Conference.

Winthrop began competing in intercollegiate basketball in 1978. The NCAA did not officially record assists as a stat until the 1983–84 season, and blocks and steals until the 1985–86 season, but William & Mary's record books includes players in these stats before these seasons. These lists are updated through the end of the 2020–21 season.

== Scoring ==
Career
Rk	Player	Points	Seasons
1	Keon Johnson	2076	2013–14 2014–15 2015–16 2016–17
2	Kelton Talford	1867	2020–21 2021–22 2022–23 2023–24 2024–25
3	Charles Brunson	1850	1978–79 1979–80 1980–81 1981–82
4	Xavier Cooks	1778	2014–15 2015–16 2016–17 2017–18
5	LaShawn Coulter	1660	1990–91 1992–93 1993–94 1994–95
6	Tyson Waterman	1461	1995–96 1996–97 1998–99 1999–00
7	Fred McKinnon	1427	1983–84 1984–85 1985–86
8	Torrell Martin	1387	2003–04 2004–05 2005–06 2006–07
9	Mark Hailey	1384	1989–90 1990–91 1991–92 1992–93
10	Mike Gaither	1302	1981–82 1982–83 1983–84

Season
Rk	Player	Points	Season
1	Charles Brunson	875	1980–81
2	Keon Johnson	715	2016–17
3	Charles Brunson	679	1981–82
4	Fred McKinnon	613	1985–86
5	Keon Johnson	599	2015–16
6	Jimmy Gavin	597	2015–16
	Ronnie Creamer	597	1978–79
8	Keon Moore	593	2014–15
9	Logan Duncomb	584	2025–26
10	Mike Gaither	576	1981–82

Single game
Rk	Player	Points	Season	Opponent
1	Melvin Branham	45	1993–94	Charleston Southern

== Rebounds ==
Career
Rk	Player	Rebounds	Seasons
1	Xavier Cooks	983	2014–15 2015–16 2016–17 2017–18
2	Kelton Talford	936	2020–21 2021–22 2022–23 2023–24 2024–25
3	Charles Brunson	913	1978–79 1979–80 1980–81 1981–82
4	Josh Ferguson	741	2016–17 2017–18 2018–19 2019–20
5	Chad Steele	692	1993–94 1994–95 1995–96 1996–97
6	Tyrone Walker	690	2000–01 2001–02 2002–03 2003–04
7	George Valentine	676	2007–08 2008–09 2009–10 2010–11 2011–12
8	Mark Hailey	675	1989–90 1990–91 1991–92 1992–93
9	Tim Raxter	652	1978–79 1979–80 1980–81 1981–82
10	Charles Corbin	648	2007–08 2008–09 2009–10 2010–11

Season
Rk	Player	Rebounds	Season
1	Charles Brunson	453	1980–81
2	Greg Lewis	313	2001–02
3	Ronnie Creamer	308	1978–79
4	Xavier Cooks	300	2016–17
5	Charles Brunson	294	1981–82
6	Allen Washington	290	1985–86
7	Mark Hailey	289	1992–93
8	Dan McQueen	285	1982–83
	Logan Duncomb	285	2025–26
10	Donnie Creamer	280	1979–80

Single game
Rk	Player	Rebounds	Season	Opponent
1	Allen Washington	23	1985–86	Piedmont

== Assists ==
Career
Rk	Player	Assists	Seasons
1	Rick Riese	656	1978–79 1979–80 1980–81
2	Chris Gaynor	567	2004–05 2005–06 2006–07 2007–08
3	Mike Fayed	557	1991–92 1992–93 1993–94 1994–95
4	Tyson Waterman	469	1995–96 1996–97 1998–99 1999–00
5	Reggie Middleton	410	2008–09 2009–10 2010–11 2011–12
6	Kasen Harrison	376	2022–23 2023–24 2024–25
7	Pierre Wooten	375	1998–99 2000–01 2001–02 2002–03
8	Chandler Vaudrin	364	2019–20 2020–21
9	Ben Bennett	362	1978–79 1979–80 1980–81
10	James Shuler	338	2002–03 2003–04 2004–05 2005–06

Season
Rk	Player	Assists	Season
1	Rick Riese	317	1980–81
2	Chandler Vaudrin	191	2019–20
3	Rick Riese	184	1978–79
4	Mike Fayed	183	1992–93
5	Chandler Vaudrin	173	2020–21
6	Mike Fayed	159	1994–95
7	Bennie Bennett	157	1978–79
8	Rick Riese	155	1979–80
9	Chris Gaynor	152	2004–05
10	Tyson Waterman	148	1999–00

Single game
Rk	Player	Assists	Season	Opponent
1	Rick Riese	17	1980–81	Limestone

== Steals ==
Career
Rk	Player	Steals	Seasons
1	Rick Riese	476	1978–79 1979–80 1980–81
2	Chris Gaynor	259	2004–05 2005–06 2006–07 2007–08
3	Roger Toxey	204	1997–98 1998–99 1999–00 2000–01
4	Tyson Waterman	186	1995–96 1996–97 1998–99 1999–00
5	LaShawn Coulter	174	1990–91 1992–93 1993–94 1994–95
6	Reggie Middleton	173	2008–09 2009–10 2010–11 2011–12
7	Mark Hailey	162	1989–90 1990–91 1991–92 1992–93
8	Torrell Martin	154	2003–04 2004–05 2005–06 2006–07
9	James Shuler	146	2002–03 2003–04 2004–05 2005–06
10	Mike Gaither	143	1981–82 1982–83 1983–84

Season
Rk	Player	Steals	Season
1	Rick Riese	208	1980–81
2	Rick Riese	140	1978–79
3	Rick Riese	128	1979–80
4	Chris Gaynor	97	2007–08
5	Chris Gaynor	70	2004–05
6	Dan McQueen	65	1982–83
7	Mike Gaither	62	1981–82
8	Roger Toxey	59	2000–01
9	Tyson Waterman	57	1996–97
10	Mantoris Robinson	56	2009–10
	Mike Gaither	56	1982–83

Single game
Rk	Player	Steals	Season	Opponent
1	Rick Riese	13	1980–81	Limestone

== Blocks ==
Career
Rk	Player	Blocks	Seasons
1	Xavier Cooks	221	2014–15 2015–16 2016–17 2017–18
2	Duby Okeke	165	2014–15 2015–16 2016–17
3	Billy Houston	139	2002–03 2003–04 2004–05 2005–06
4	Josh Grant	125	2001–02 2002–03 2003–04
5	Chase Claxton	118	2019–20 2020–21 2021–22 2022–23 2023–24
6	Tyrone Walker	104	2000–01 2001–02 2002–03 2003–04
7	Allen Washington	103	1983–84 1984–85 1985–86
8	George Valentine	97	2007–08 2008–09 2009–10 2010–11 2011–12
	Rick Riese	97	1978–79 1979–80 1980–81
10	Todd Lassiter	96	1993–94 1994–95 1995–96 1996–97

Season
Rk	Player	Blocks	Season
1	Duby Okeke	72	2015–16
2	Josh Grant	66	2002–03
3	Xavier Cooks	64	2017–18
4	Xavier Cooks	56	2016–17
5	Xavier Cooks	54	2015–16
6	Billy Houston	52	2004–05
7	Xavier Cooks	47	2014–15
	Duby Okeke	47	2016–17
9	Duby Okeke	46	2014–15
	Allen Washington	46	1985–86

Single game
Rk	Player	Blocks	Season	Opponent
1	Rick Riese	7	1980–81	Limestone
	Billy Houston	7	2005–06	UNC Asheville
