= 2006 Big South Conference men's basketball tournament =

- Classification: Division I
- Season: 2005–06
- Teams: 8
- Site: Campus sites
- Finals site: Winthrop Coliseum; Rock Hill, SC
- Champions: Winthrop (7th title)
- Winning coach: Gregg Marshall (6th title)

2005–06 Big South Conference men's basketball standings
	Conf.				Overall
Team	W		L	PCT	W		L	PCT
Winthrop †	13	–	3	.813	23	–	8	.742
Birmingham–Southern	12	–	4	.750	19	–	9	.679
Coastal Carolina	12	–	4	.750	20	–	10	.667
Radford	9	–	7	.563	16	–	13	.552
High Point	8	–	8	.500	16	–	13	.552
Charleston Southern	7	–	9	.438	13	–	16	.448
UNC Asheville	6	–	10	.375	9	–	19	.321
Liberty	3	–	13	.188	7	–	23	.233
VMI	2	–	14	.125	7	–	20	.259
† 2006 Big South tournament winner Rankings from AP Poll

The 2006 Big South Conference men's basketball tournament took place February 28, March 2, 4, 2011, at campus sites. The tournament was won by the Winthrop Eagles, as they defeated Liberty in the quarterfinals 93–52, High Point 77–65 in the semifinal round, and finally Coastal Carolina 51–50 in the championship game.

== Format ==
The top eight eligible teams can qualify for the Big South tournament. The seeds are judged by conference winning percentage. The winner receives an automatic bid to the NCAA tournament. Winthrop got the bid to the NCAA Tournament, and fell in the first round as the #15 seed to #2 seed Tennessee, 63–61.

== Bracket ==
Quarterfinals; March 2
1	Winthrop	93
8	Liberty	52
4	Radford	84
5	High Point	87
3	Birmingham–Southern	76
6	Charleston Southern	97
2	Coastal Carolina	78
7	UNC Asheville	62

Semifinals; March 4
1	Winthrop	77
5	High Point	65
6	Charleston Southern	67
2	Coastal Carolina	73

Finals; March 6
1	Winthrop	51
2	Coastal Carolina	50
