= 2001 Big South Conference men's basketball tournament =

- Classification: Division I
- Season: 2000–01
- Teams: 6
- Site: Roanoke Civic Center; Roanoke, VA
- Champions: Winthrop (4th title)
- Winning coach: Gregg Marshall (3rd title)
- MVP: Andrey Savtchenko (Radford)

2000–01 Big South Conference men's basketball standings
| | Conf. | | | | Overall |
| Team | W | | L | PCT | W | | L | PCT |
|---|---|---|---|---|---|---|---|---|
| Radford | 12 | – | 2 | .857 | 19 | – | 10 | .655 |
| Winthrop † | 11 | – | 3 | .786 | 18 | – | 13 | .581 |
| UNC Asheville | 9 | – | 5 | .643 | 15 | – | 13 | .536 |
| Coastal Carolina | 6 | – | 8 | .429 | 8 | – | 20 | .286 |
| Charleston Southern | 6 | – | 8 | .429 | 10 | – | 19 | .345 |
| Liberty | 5 | – | 9 | .357 | 15 | – | 13 | .536 |
| Elon* | 4 | – | 10 | .286 | 9 | – | 20 | .310 |
| High Point* | 3 | – | 11 | .214 | 8 | – | 20 | .286 |
† 2001 Big South tournament winner Rankings from AP Poll; *Ineligible for conference tournament

The 2001 Big South Conference men's basketball tournament took place March 1–3, 2001, at the Roanoke Civic Center in Roanoke, Virginia. For the third consecutive year, the tournament was won by the Winthrop Eagles, led by head coach Gregg Marshall.

== Format ==
Six teams participated in the tournament, hosted at the Roanoke Civic Center. Teams were seeded by conference winning percentage. As part of their transitional phase, conference members Elon and High Point were ineligible for the tournament.

== Bracket ==
Quarterfinals; March 1
4 | Coastal Carolina | 64
5 | Charleston Southern | 77
3 | UNC Asheville | 48
6 | Liberty | 60

Semifinals; March 2
1 | Radford | 65
5 | Charleston Southern | 62
2 | Winthrop | 67
6 | Liberty | 62^{2OT}

Finals; March 3
1 | Radford | 65^{OT}
2 | Winthrop | 67

- Source

== All-Tournament Team ==
- Andrey Savtchenko, Radford
- Tyrone Walker, Winthrop
- Derrick Knox, Winthrop
- Jason Williams, Radford
- Chris Caldwell, Liberty
