= 2006–07 Winthrop Eagles men's basketball team =

American college basketball season

2006–07 Winthrop Eagles men's basketball
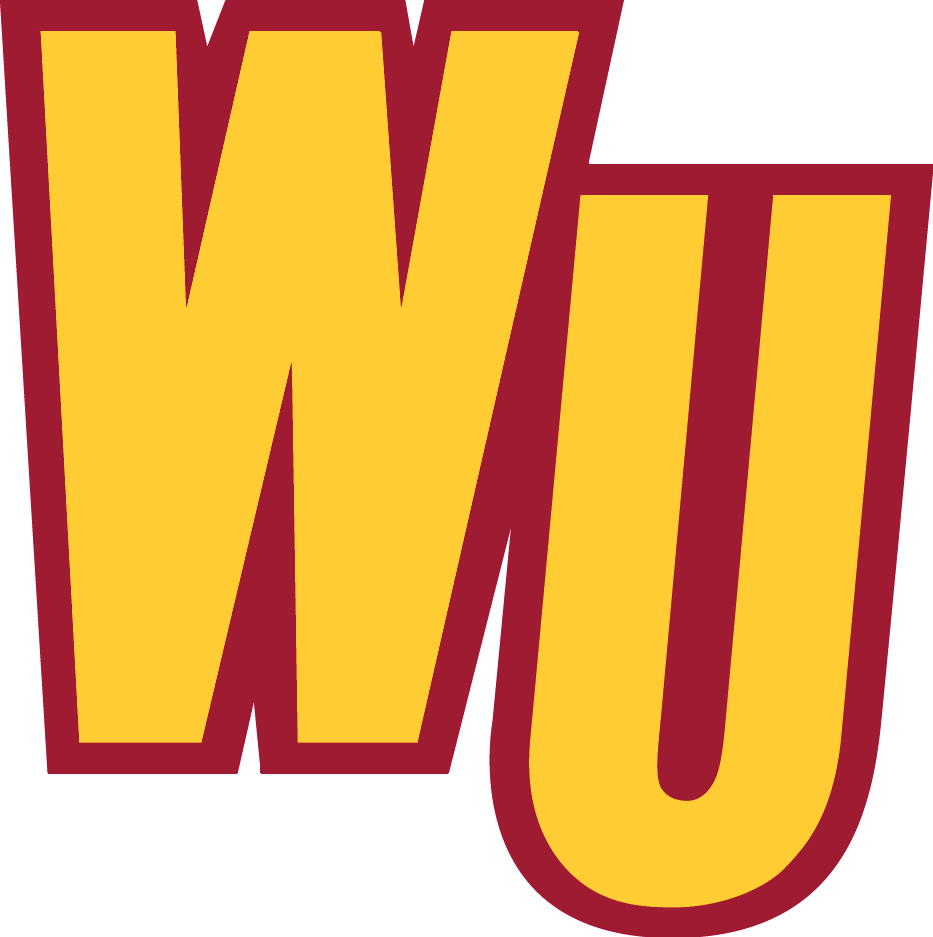

Big South Season and Big South tournament champions

NCAA tournament, second round
- Conference: Big South Conference

Ranking
- Coaches: No. 22
- AP: No. 22
- Record: 29–5 (14–0 Big South)
- Head coach: Gregg Marshall (9th season)
- Assistant coaches: Randy Peele; Paul Molinari; Earl Grant
- Home arena: Winthrop Coliseum

2006–07 Big South Conference men's basketball standings
	Conf.				Overall
Team	W		L	PCT	W		L	PCT
No. 22 Winthrop †	14	–	0	1.000	29	–	5	.853
High Point	11	–	3	.786	22	–	10	.688
Liberty	8	–	6	.571	14	–	17	.452
UNC Asheville	6	–	8	.429	12	–	19	.387
Coastal Carolina	7	–	7	.500	15	–	15	.500
VMI	5	–	9	.357	14	–	19	.424
Radford	3	–	11	.214	8	–	22	.267
Charleston Southern	2	–	12	.143	8	–	22	.267
† 2007 Big South tournament winner Rankings from AP Poll

The 2006–07 Winthrop Eagles men's basketball team represented Winthrop University during the 2006–07 college basketball season. This was head coach Gregg Marshall's ninth and final season at Winthrop. The Eagles competed in the Big South Conference and played their home games at Winthrop Coliseum. They finished the season 29–5, 14–0 in Big South play to finish as conference regular season champions. They won the 2007 Big South Conference men's basketball tournament to receive the conference's automatic bid to the 2007 NCAA Division I men's basketball tournament as No. 11 seed in the Midwest region. The Eagles defeated Notre Dame in the first round – the Big South’s first win in NCAA Tournament play – before falling to No. 3 seed Oregon in the Round of 32.

Winthrop finished the season ranked No. 22 in both major college basketball polls. After the season, Marshall left to take over as head coach at Wichita State. Assistant Randy Peele would be elevated to head coach for the 2007–08 season.

== Roster ==
2006–07 Winthrop Eagles men's basketball team
Players
Coaches

Pos.	#	Name	Height	Weight	Year	Previous school	Hometown
C	00	Anthony Williams	6 ft 7 in (2.01 m)	235 lb (107 kg)	Fr		Eagle Lake, Florida
G	1	Antwon Harris	6 ft 3 in (1.91 m)	200 lb (91 kg)	Jr	Highland CC	Clarksville, Tennessee
G	2	Kyle Moore	6 ft 3 in (1.91 m)	180 lb (82 kg)	Fr		Gainesville, Florida
F	3	Mantoris Robinson	6 ft 5 in (1.96 m)	195 lb (88 kg)	RS Fr		Charlotte, North Carolina
F/C	5	Craig Bradshaw	6 ft 10 in (2.08 m)	242 lb (110 kg)	Sr		Wellington, New Zealand
G	10	Chris Gaynor	5 ft 10 in (1.78 m)	160 lb (73 kg)	Jr	Mount Tabor	Winston-Salem, North Carolina
G	11	Michael Jenkins	6 ft 3 in (1.91 m)	190 lb (86 kg)	Jr	Kinston	Kinston, North Carolina
G	12	Torrell Martin	6 ft 5 in (1.96 m)	202 lb (92 kg)	Sr		Columbia, South Carolina
C	21	Jason Killeen	6 ft 10 in (2.08 m)	240 lb (109 kg)	So		Limerick, Ireland
F	22	Rainer Blickle	6 ft 7 in (2.01 m)	190 lb (86 kg)	Fr		Mauldin, South Carolina
G	24	De'Andre Adams	5 ft 8 in (1.73 m)	158 lb (72 kg)	So		Austell, Georgia
G	25	Byron Faison	6 ft 1 in (1.85 m)	180 lb (82 kg)	Fr		Sumter, South Carolina
F	31	Taj McCullough	6 ft 7 in (2.01 m)	220 lb (100 kg)	Jr	Carver	Atlanta, Georgia
F/C	33	Phillip Williams	6 ft 8 in (2.03 m)	217 lb (98 kg)	Sr		Cleveland, North Carolina
F	44	Jonathan Rice	6 ft 5 in (1.96 m)	215 lb (98 kg)	So		Columbia, South Carolina

Head coach

- Gregg Marshall

Assistant coach(es)

- Randy Peele
- Paul Molinari
- Earl Grant

Legend

- (C) Team captain
- (S) Suspended
- (I) Ineligible
- (W) Walk-on
- Injured
- Current redshirt

Roster

== Schedule and results ==
- All times are Eastern

Date time, TV	Rank^{#}	Opponent^{#}	Result	Record	Site (attendance) city, state
Non-conference regular season
Nov 10, 2006*		North Greenville	W 89–46	1–0	Winthrop Coliseum (3,873); Rock Hill, South Carolina
Nov 14, 2006*		vs. Iona; NIT Season Tip-Off	W 57–38	2–0	Time Warner Cable Arena (7,060); Charlotte, North Carolina
Nov 15, 2006*; 7:00 p.m.		vs. No. 2 North Carolina; NIT Season Tip-Off	L 66–73	2–1	Time Warner Cable Arena (7,362); Charlotte, North Carolina
Nov 18, 2006*		at Mississippi State	W 74–63	3–1	Humphrey Coliseum (10,316); Starkville, Mississippi
Nov 20, 2006*		at No. 25 Maryland	L 60–71	3–2	Comcast Center (17,950); College Park, Maryland
Nov 27, 2006*		Virginia Intermont	W 90–46	4–2	Winthrop Coliseum (2,566); Rock Hill, South Carolina
Nov 29, 2006*		Presbyterian	W 76–51	5–2	Winthrop Coliseum (2,887); Rock Hill, South Carolina
Dec 2, 2006*		at Northern Illinois	W 72–62	6–2	Convocation Center (2,035); DeKalb, Illinois
Dec 4, 2006*; 8:00 p.m.		at No. 11 Wisconsin	L 79–82 ^{OT}	6–3	Kohl Center (17,190); Madison, Wisconsin
Dec 9, 2006*		Limestone	W 80–46	7–3	Winthrop Coliseum (3,084); Rock Hill, South Carolina
Dec 18, 2006*		Mount St. Mary's	W 74–59	8–3	Winthrop Coliseum (2,359); Rock Hill, South Carolina
Dec 21, 2006*		at East Carolina	W 69–50	9–3	Minges Coliseum (3,750); Greenville, North Carolina
Dec 29, 2006*		at Old Dominion	W 71–65	10–3	Ted Constant Convocation Center (6,252); Norfolk, Virginia
Jan 2, 2007*		at Texas A&M	L 51–71	10–4	Reed Arena (10,015); College Station, Texas
Big South Regular Season
Jan 6, 2007		VMI	W 108–76	11–4 (1–0)	Winthrop Coliseum (5,117); Rock Hill, South Carolina
Jan 8, 2007		at Charleston Southern	W 75–52	12–4 (2–0)	Buccaneer Field House (2,563); North Charleston, South Carolina
Jan 13, 2007		at Liberty	W 68–40	13–4 (3–0)	Vines Center (1,261); Lynchburg, Virginia
Jan 15, 2007		UNC Asheville	W 61–42	14–4 (4–0)	Winthrop Coliseum (3,818); Rock Hill, South Carolina
Jan 20, 2007		at Radford	W 62–59	15–4 (5–0)	Donald N. Dedmon Center (1,325); Radford, Virginia
Jan 25, 2007		at High Point	W 64–63	16–4 (6–0)	Millis Center (2,138); High Point, North Carolina
Jan 27, 2007		Coastal Carolina	W 65–63	17–4 (7–0)	Winthrop Coliseum (6,100); Rock Hill, South Carolina
Jan 31, 2007		at VMI	W 109–96	18–4 (8–0)	Cameron Hall (2,453); Lexington, Virginia
Feb 3, 2007		at UNC Asheville	W 88–69	19–4 (9–0)	Charlie Justice Center (1,206); Asheville, North Carolina
Feb 6, 2007		Liberty	W 80–76	20–4 (10–0)	Winthrop Coliseum (3,629); Rock Hill, South Carolina
Feb 10, 2007		Radford	W 77–58	21–4 (11–0)	Winthrop Coliseum (6,062); Rock Hill, South Carolina
Feb 14, 2007		Charleston Southern	W 78–54	22–4 (12–0)	Winthrop Coliseum (2,215); Rock Hill, South Carolina
Feb 16, 2007*		at Missouri State	W 77–66	23–4	Hammons Student Center (7,419); Springfield, Missouri
Feb 20, 2007		High Point	W 72–60	24–4 (13–0)	Winthrop Coliseum (4,420); Rock Hill, South Carolina
Feb 24, 2007		at Coastal Carolina	W 83–69	25–4 (14–0)	Kimbel Arena (1,054); Conway, South Carolina
Big South tournament
Feb 27, 2007*		Charleston Southern	W 72–42	26–4	Winthrop Coliseum (3,111); Rock Hill, South Carolina
Mar 1, 2007*		UNC Asheville; Semifinals	W 79–60	27–4	Winthrop Coliseum (4,518); Rock Hill, South Carolina
Mar 3, 2007*		VMI; Championship Game	W 84–81	28–4	Winthrop Coliseum (6,250); Rock Hill, South Carolina
NCAA tournament
Mar 16, 2007*	(11 MW) No. 22	vs. (6 MW) No. 17 Notre Dame; First Round	W 74–64	29–4	Spokane Veterans Memorial Arena (11,551); Spokane, Washington
Mar 18, 2007*	(11 MW) No. 22	vs. (3 MW) No. 10 Oregon; Second Round	L 61–75	29–5	Spokane Veterans Memorial Arena (11,551); Spokane, Washington
*Non-conference game. ^{#}Rankings from AP poll. (#) Tournament seedings in parentheses. MW=Midwest. All times are in Eastern.
