= 1999 Big South Conference men's basketball tournament =

- Classification: Division I
- Season: 1998–99
- Teams: 6
- Site: Asheville Civic Center; Asheville, NC
- Champions: Winthrop (2nd title)
- Winning coach: Gregg Marshall (1st title)
- MVP: Heson Groves (Winthrop)

1998–99 Big South Conference men's basketball standings
	Conf.				Overall
Team	W		L	PCT	W		L	PCT
Winthrop †	9	–	1	.900	21	–	8	.724
Radford	8	–	2	.800	20	–	8	.714
UNC Asheville	5	–	5	.500	11	–	18	.379
Charleston Southern	4	–	6	.400	12	–	16	.429
Coastal Carolina	4	–	6	.400	7	–	20	.259
Liberty	0	–	10	.000	4	–	23	.148
† 1999 Big South tournament winner Rankings from AP Poll

The 1999 Big South Conference men's basketball tournament took place February 25–27, 1999, at the Asheville Civic Center in Asheville, North Carolina. For the second time in their school history, the Winthrop Eagles won the tournament, led by head coach Gregg Marshall.

== Format ==
All six teams participated in the tournament, hosted at the Asheville Civic Center. Teams were seeded by conference winning percentage. Elon and High Point were making their transition to the league during the season, and were not yet included as full members.

== Bracket ==
Quarterfinals; February 25
4	Charleston Southern	87
5	Coastal Carolina	67
3	UNC Asheville	106
6	Liberty	98

Semifinals; February 26
1	Winthrop	70
4	Charleston Southern	61
2	Radford	92
3	UNC Asheville	79

Finals; February 27
1	Winthrop	86
2	Radford	74

- Source

== All-Tournament Team ==
- Greg Lewis, Winthrop
- Tyson Waterman, Winthrop
- Leslie Ballard, Radford
- Kevin Martin, UNC Asheville
- Adam Larrick, Charleston Southern
