= 2002 Big South Conference men's basketball tournament =

- Classification: Division I
- Season: 2001–02
- Teams: 8
- Site: Roanoke Civic Center; Roanoke, VA
- Champions: Winthrop (5th title)
- Winning coach: Gregg Marshall (4th title)
- MVP: Greg Lewis (Winthrop)

2001–02 Big South Conference men's basketball standings
| | Conf. | | | | Overall |
| Team | W | | L | PCT | W | | L | PCT |
|---|---|---|---|---|---|---|---|---|
| Winthrop † | 10 | – | 4 | .714 | 19 | – | 12 | .613 |
| UNC Asheville | 10 | – | 4 | .714 | 13 | – | 15 | .464 |
| Radford | 9 | – | 5 | .643 | 15 | – | 16 | .484 |
| Charleston Southern | 8 | – | 6 | .571 | 12 | – | 17 | .414 |
| Elon | 7 | – | 7 | .500 | 13 | – | 16 | .448 |
| Coastal Carolina | 5 | – | 9 | .357 | 8 | – | 20 | .286 |
| High Point | 5 | – | 9 | .357 | 11 | – | 19 | .367 |
| Liberty | 2 | – | 12 | .143 | 5 | – | 25 | .167 |
† 2002 Big South tournament winner Rankings from AP Poll

The 2002 Big South Conference men's basketball tournament took place February 28–March 2, 2002, at the Roanoke Civic Center in Roanoke, Virginia. For the fourth consecutive year, the tournament was won by the Winthrop Eagles, led by head coach Gregg Marshall.

== Format ==
All eight teams participated in the tournament, hosted at the Roanoke Civic Center. Teams were seeded by conference winning percentage. Birmingham–Southern was in a transitional phase to the conference during the season, and not technically counted as a conference member.

== Bracket ==
Quarterfinals; February 28
1 | Winthrop | 66
8 | Liberty | 59
4 | Charleston Southern | 64
5 | Elon | 83
3 | Radford | 81
6 | Coastal Carolina | 66
2 | UNC Asheville | 71
7 | High Point | 72

Semifinals; March 1
1 | Winthrop | 77
5 | Elon | 66
3 | Radford | 70^{OT}
7 | High Point | 72

Finals; March 2
1 | Winthrop | 70
7 | High Point | 48

- Source

== All-Tournament Team ==
- Greg Lewis, Winthrop
- Pierre Wooten, Winthrop
- Jay Wallace, High Point
- Joe Knight, High Point
- Correy Watkins, Radford
