= UNC Greensboro Spartans men's basketball statistical leaders =

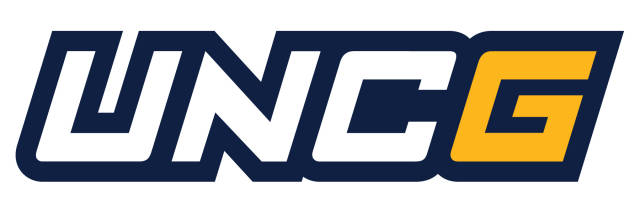

The UNC Greensboro Spartans men's basketball statistical leaders are individual statistical leaders of the UNC Greensboro Spartans men's basketball program in various categories, including points, rebounds, assists, steals, and blocks. Within those areas, the lists identify single-game, single-season, and career leaders. The Spartans represent the University of North Carolina at Greensboro in the NCAA's Southern Conference.

UNC Greensboro began competing in intercollegiate basketball in 1966.

The NCAA did not officially record assists as a stat until the 1983–84 season, and blocks and steals until the 1985–86 season, but UNC Greensboro's record books includes players in these stats before these seasons. These lists are updated through the end of the 2025–26 season.

== Scoring ==
Career
Rk	Player	Points	Seasons
1	Kyle Hines	2,187	2004–05 2005–06 2006–07 2007–08
2	Francis Alonso	2,142	2015–16 2016–17 2017–18 2018–19
3	Isaiah Miller	1,967	2016–17 2017–18 2018–19 2019–20 2020–21
4	Jay Joseph	1,646	2000–01 2001–02 2002–03 2003–04
5	Keyshaun Langley	1,641	2019–20 2020–21 2021–22 2022–23 2023–24
6	James Maye	1,574	1998–99 1999–2000 2000–01 2001–02 2002–03
7	Ricky Hickman	1,544	2003–04 2004–05 2005–06 2006–07
8	Scott Hartzell	1,539	1992–93 1993–94 1994–95 1995–96
9	Kayel Locke	1,522	2012–13 2013–14 2014–15 2015–16
10	Yusuf Stewart	1,514	1989–90 1990–91 1991–92 1992–93

Season
Rk	Player	Points	Season
1	Robert Bryant	657	1985–86
2	Francis Alonso	632	2018–19
3	Justin Neely	609	2025–26
4	Kyle Hines	605	2006–07
5	Kyle Hines	596	2007–08
6	Kyle Hines	578	2005–06
7	Isaiah Miller	569	2019–20
8	Isaiah Miller	557	2020–21
9	Trevis Simpson	550	2011–12
10	Isaiah Miller	549	2018–19

Single game
Rk	Player	Points	Season	Opponent
1	Trevis Simpson	41	2012–13	Chattanooga
	Bruce Shaw	41	1968–69	Charleston
3	Robert Bryant	40	1985–86	Virginia Wesleyan
4	Mikeal Brown-Jones	39	2023–24	Western Carolina
	Mikeal Brown-Jones	39	2023–24	The Citadel
6	Kyle Hines	38	2006–07	Marshall

== Rebounds ==
Career
Rk	Player	Points	Seasons
1	James Dickey	1,060	2016–17 2017–18 2018–19 2019–20
2	Kyle Hines	1,047	2004–05 2005–06 2006–07 2007–08
3	Ben Stywall	961	2006–07 2007–08 2008–09 2009–10
4	Bruce Shaw	933	1968–69 1969–70 1970–71 1971–72
5	RJ White	878	2012–13 2013–14 2014–15 2015–16 2016–17
6	Eric Cuthrell	859	1992–93 1993–94 1994–95 1995–96
7	Mohammed Abdulsalam	732	2018–19 2019–20 2020–21 2021–22 2022–23
8	Demetrius Cherry	722	1995–96 1996–97 1997–98 1998–99 1999–2000
9	Kayel Locke	652	2012–13 2013–14 2014–15 2015–16
10	James Maye	649	1998–99 1999–2000 2000–01 2001–02 2002–03

Season
Rk	Player	Points	Season
1	Justin Neely	391	2025–26
2	Ben Stywall	323	2009–10
3	James Dickey	297	2019–20
4	James Dickey	286	2017–18
5	Kyle Cain	285	2007–08
6	Eric Cuthrell	284	1994–95
7	Kyle Hines	281	2007–08
8	Eric Cuthrell	276	1995–96
9	Demetrius Cherry	262	1999–2000
10	Kyle Hines	260	2006–07

Single game
Rk	Player	Points	Season	Opponent
1	Tom Martin	27	1972–73	
2	Bruce Shaw	25	1968–69	St. Andrews
3	Justin Neely	24	2025–26	Wofford
4	Kyle Hines	21	2005–06	Charleston

== Assists ==
Career
Rk	Player	Points	Seasons
1	Courtney Eldridge	584	1998–99 1999–2000 2000–01 2001–02
2	Scott Hartzell	552	1992–93 1993–94 1994–95 1995–96
3	Demetrius Troy	453	2014–15 2015–16 2016–17 2017–18 2018–19
4	Kobe Langley	440	2019–20 2020–21 2021–22 2022–23 2023–24
5	Diante Baldwin	437	2012–13 2013–14 2014–15 2015–16 2016–17
6	Dwayne Johnson	427	2004–05 2005–06 2006–07 2007–08
7	Derrick Nix	421	1993–94 1994–95 1995–96 1996–97
8	William Powell	414	1982–83 1983–84 1984–85 1985–86
9	Keyshaun Langley	394	2019–20 2020–21 2021–22 2022–23 2023–24
10	Isaiah Miller	342	2017–18 2018–19 2018–19 2019–20 2020–21

Season
Rk	Player	Points	Season
1	Courtney Eldridge	182	2001–02
2	Kobe Langley	181	2023–24
3	Courtney Eldridge	179	2000–01
4	Diante Baldwin	169	2015–16
5	William Powell	159	1984–85
6	Greg Myrick	158	1986–87
7	Bill Winfrey	151	1978–79
8	Scott Hartzell	149	1995–96
	Diante Baldwin	149	2016–17
10	Scott Hartzell	148	1994–95

Single game
Rk	Player	Points	Season	Opponent
1	William Powell	13	1984–85	Averett
2	4 times	12	Most recent: Dwayne Johnson, 2004–05 Bridgewater	

== Steals ==
Career
Rk	Player	Points	Seasons
1	Isaiah Miller	315	2017–18 2018–19 2018–19 2019–20 2020–21
2	Ricky Hickman	236	2003–04 2004–05 2005–06 2006–07
3	Courtney Eldridge	226	1998–99 1999–2000 2000–01 2001–02
4	Kobe Langley	217	2019–20 2020–21 2021–22 2022–23 2023–24
5	Keyshaun Langley	208	2019–20 2020–21 2021–22 2022–23 2023–24
6	Kyle Hines	185	2004–05 2005–06 2006–07 2007–08
7	Diante Baldwin	170	2012–13 2013–14 2014–15 2015–16 2016–17
8	Demetrius Troy	160	2014–15 2015–16 2016–17 2017–18 2018–19
9	Ron Sheppard	152	1985–86 1986–87 1987–88 1988–89
10	Ben Stywall	141	2006–07 2007–08 2008–09 2009–10

Season
Rk	Player	Points	Season
1	Isaiah Miller	104	2018–19
2	Isaiah Miller	89	2019–20
3	Courtney Eldridge	82	2000–01
4	Ricky Hickman	79	2004–05
5	Courtney Eldridge	78	2001–02
6	Ricky Hickman	77	2005–06
	Ron Sheppard	77	1986–87
8	Ron Sheppard	75	1988–89
	Kobe Langley	75	2023–24
10	Isaiah Miller	74	2020–21

Single game
Rk	Player	Points	Season	Opponent
1	Isaiah Miller	9	2019–20	Mercer
2	6 times	7	Most recent: Isaiah Miller, 2020–21 VMI	
8	16 times	6	Most recent: Isaiah Miller, 2018–19 Western Carolina	

== Blocks ==
Career
Rk	Player	Points	Seasons
1	Kyle Hines	349	2004–05 2005–06 2006–07 2007–08
2	James Dickey	222	2016–17 2017–18 2018–19 2019–20
3	Eric Cuthrell	183	1992–93 1993–94 1994–95 1995–96
4	RJ White	142	2012–13 2013–14 2014–15 2015–16 2016–17
5	Jonathan Clifton	122	1992–93 1993–94 1994–95 1995–96
6	Kyrin Galloway	118	2016–17 2017–18 2018–19 2019–20
7	Pete Brown	83	2006–07 2007–08 2008–09 2009–10
8	Larry Gilbert	81	1995–96 1996–97 1997–98 1998–99
9	Ronnie Burrell	77	2001–02 2002–03 2003–04 2004–05
10	Ben Stywall	75	2006–07 2007–08 2008–09 2009–10

Season
Rk	Player	Points	Season
1	Kyle Hines	106	2004–05
2	Kyle Hines	95	2007–08
3	Kyle Hines	84	2005–06
4	James Dickey	71	2017–18
5	Eric Cuthrell	68	1994–95
6	Hayden Koval	65	2020–21
7	Kyle Hines	64	2006–07
8	Damian Eagle	57	2008–09
9	James Dickey	56	2018–19
10	James Dickey	55	2019–20

Single game
Rk	Player	Points	Season	Opponent
1	James Dickey	8	2017–18	ETSU
2	7 times	7	Most recent: Hayden Koval, 2020–21 Little Rock	
9	11 times	6	Most recent: Pete Brown, 2009–10 Elon	
