= 2000 Big South Conference men's basketball tournament =

- Classification: Division I
- Season: 1999–00
- Teams: 6
- Site: Asheville Civic Center; Asheville, NC
- Champions: Winthrop (3rd title)
- Winning coach: Gregg Marshall (2nd title)
- MVP: Greg Lewis (Winthrop)

1999–2000 Big South Conference men's basketball standings
| | Conf. | | | | Overall |
| Team | W | | L | PCT | W | | L | PCT |
|---|---|---|---|---|---|---|---|---|
| Radford | 12 | – | 2 | .857 | 18 | – | 10 | .643 |
| Winthrop † | 11 | – | 3 | .786 | 21 | – | 9 | .700 |
| Coastal Carolina | 7 | – | 7 | .500 | 10 | – | 18 | .357 |
| UNC Asheville | 7 | – | 7 | .500 | 11 | – | 18 | .379 |
| Elon* | 7 | – | 7 | .500 | 13 | – | 15 | .464 |
| High Point* | 5 | – | 9 | .357 | 11 | – | 17 | .393 |
| Liberty | 4 | – | 10 | .286 | 14 | – | 14 | .500 |
| Charleston Southern | 3 | – | 11 | .214 | 8 | – | 21 | .276 |
† 2000 Big South tournament winner Rankings from AP Poll; *Ineligible for conference tournament

The 2000 Big South Conference men's basketball tournament took place March 2–4, 2000, at the Asheville Civic Center in Asheville, North Carolina. For the second consecutive year, the tournament was won by the Winthrop Eagles, led by head coach Gregg Marshall.

== Format ==
Six teams participated in the tournament, hosted at the Asheville Civic Center. Teams were seeded by conference winning percentage. As part of their transitional phase, conference members Elon and High Point were ineligible for the tournament.

== Bracket ==
Quarterfinals; March 2
4 | UNC Asheville | 77
5 | Liberty | 66
3 | Coastal Carolina | 71
6 | Charleston Southern | 83

Semifinals; March 3
1 | Radford | 71
4 | UNC Asheville | 78
2 | Winthrop | 90
6 | Charleston Southern | 65

Finals; March 4
4 | UNC Asheville | 62
2 | Winthrop | 75

- Source

== All-Tournament Team ==
- Greg Lewis, Winthrop
- Tyson Waterman, Winthrop
- Robbie Waldrop, Winthrop
- Brett Carey, UNC Asheville
- Andre Smith, UNC Asheville
