= Tom Sullivan (basketball) =

American basketball player and coach (born 1950)

Biographical details
- Born: April 18, 1950 (age 76)

Playing career
- 1968–1972: Fordham
- 1972–1973: Italy (professional)
- 1974–1975: Switzerland (professional)
- Position: Center

Coaching career (HC unless noted)
- 1973–1974: Hunter (asst.)
- 1975–1976: New Hampshire College (asst.)
- 1976–1985: New Hampshire College
- 1985–1986: Manhattan
- 1987–1994: Seton Hall (asst.)
- 1995–2004: UMBC

Head coaching record
- Overall: 260–270

Accomplishments and honors

Championships
- 2× NCAA Division II New England Region championships (1980, 1981); Northeast Conference regular season champions (1999)

Awards
- Co-Haggerty Award winner (1972); 2× New England Coach of the Year (1980, 1981); Big South Conference Coach of the Year (1998); Northeast Conference Coach of the Year (1999)

Thomas Sullivan (born April 18, 1950) is an American former professional basketball player and college coach.

== Playing career ==
Sullivan grew up in the Bronx, New York City. He played collegiately at Fordham University and was a four-year letterwinner from 1968 to 1969 through 1971–72, playing the center position. As a senior, Sullivan was the Rams' co-captain and named the team MVP. He guided Fordham to a berth in the National Invitation Tournament where they would lose in the first round to Jacksonville. At the end of that season, Sullivan was presented with the Haggerty Award, given annually since 1935–36 to the top male collegiate basketball player in the greater New York City area. He was the co-recipient with Manhattan's Richie Garner, becoming the first duo to share the award in its history up to that point.

Following his career at Fordham, Sullivan was chosen in the 1972 NBA draft by the New York Knicks. He was taken in the ninth round (139th overall). Although he was drafted, Sullivan never played in the National Basketball Association. Instead, he went to Italy to play professionally in 1972–73, took the following year off to coach back in the United States, and then spent the 1974–75 playing again, only this time in Switzerland. After two seasons in three years playing as an expatriate professional basketball player, Sullivan returned to the United States to pursue coaching full-time.

== Coaching career ==
Sullivan began his coaching career as an assistant at Hunter College during the interim year between professional seasons. His next job came as an assistant coach at New Hampshire College (now Southern New Hampshire University) during 1975–76, and after only one year at the school he became its full-time head coach in 1976. Sullivan stayed at New Hampshire College from 1976 to 1977 through 1984–85 and also concurrently served as the athletic director for much of his tenure. During his nine-year career at the NCAA Division II school, he compiled an overall record of 152–99, including three 20-win seasons. Sullivan led the team to two Division II New England Region championships (1980, 1981) as he earned regional coach of the year honors both of those years.

He left New Hampshire College to take the reins at Manhattan College in which he compiled a 2–26 overall record his first year there. Sullivan only stayed one season, however, and left to become P. J. Carlesimo's assistant at Seton Hall between 1987–88 and 1993–94. During this seven-year stretch, the Pirates made six NCAA Division I Tournaments, including a national championship game appearance in 1989, which they lost to Michigan in overtime.

When Carlesimo left after 1993–94, Sullivan was a finalist for the head coaching vacancy. The position ultimately went to George Blaney from Holy Cross. After a one-year absence from coaching, Sullivan became the new head coach at UMBC in 1995. Over the course of his nine-year coaching career at UMBC, he compiled an overall record of 106–145, becoming the second coach in program history to amass 100 wins. He named the Big South Conference Coach of the Year in 1998 after an eight-game improvement from the season before, and in 1999 was named the Northeast Conference Coach of the Year. The school had switched conferences between years, and the 1998–99 season saw the Retrievers set a league record for consecutive wins to begin a season (15) en route to the conference regular season title. Three years later, and for the first time in the program's Division I history, UMBC won 20 games in a season under Sullivan's guidance. After that season he signed a contract extension to be effective through the 2006–07 season. However, after a 7–21 year in 2003–04, Sullivan resigned. His career college head coaching record is 260–270 in 19 seasons.

== Head coaching record ==
Record table
| Season | Team | Overall | Conference | Standing | Postseason |
|---|---|---|---|---|---|
New Hampshire College Penmen (Mayflower Conference) (1976–1981)
| 1976–77 | New Hampshire College | 10–15 | | | |
| 1977–78 | New Hampshire College | 14–13 | | | |
| 1978–79 | New Hampshire College | 16–9 | | | |
| 1979–80 | New Hampshire College | 22–8 | | | NCAA New England Regional Champions |
| 1980–81 | New Hampshire College | 23–7 | | | NCAA New England Regional Champions |
New Hampshire College Penmen (NECBL) (1981–1985)
| 1981–82 | New Hampshire College | 18–10 | | | |
| 1982–83 | New Hampshire College | 11–17 | | | |
| 1983–84 | New Hampshire College | 18–11 | | | |
| 1984–85 | New Hampshire College | 20–9 | | | |
| New Hampshire College: | | 152–99 | | | |
Manhattan Jaspers (Metro Atlantic Athletic Conference) (1985–1986)
| 1985–86 | Manhattan | 2–26 | 1–14 | | |
| Manhattan: | | 2–26 | 1–14 | | |
UMBC Retrievers (Big South Conference) (1995–1998)
| 1995–96 | UMBC | 5–22 | 3–11 | 7th | |
| 1996–97 | UMBC | 5–22 | 3–11 | 7th | |
| 1997–98 | UMBC | 14–14 | 6–6 | 3rd | |
UMBC Retrievers (Northeast Conference) (1998–2003)
| 1998–99 | UMBC | 19–9 | 17–3 | 1st | |
| 1999–00 | UMBC | 11–18 | 7–11 | T–7th | |
| 2000–01 | UMBC | 18–11 | 13–7 | 3rd | |
| 2001–02 | UMBC | 20–9 | 15–5 | T–2nd | |
| 2002–03 | UMBC | 7–20 | 5–13 | 12th | |
UMBC Retrievers (America East Conference) (2003–2004)
| 2003–04 | UMBC | 7–21 | 4–14 | 9th | |
| UMBC: | | 106–145 | 73–81 | | |
| Total: | | 260–270 | | | |
National champion Postseason invitational champion Conference regular season champion Conference regular season and conference tournament champion Division regular season champion Division regular season and conference tournament champion Conference tournament champion
