= 2004–05 Winthrop Eagles men's basketball team =

American college basketball season

2004–05 Winthrop Eagles men's basketball
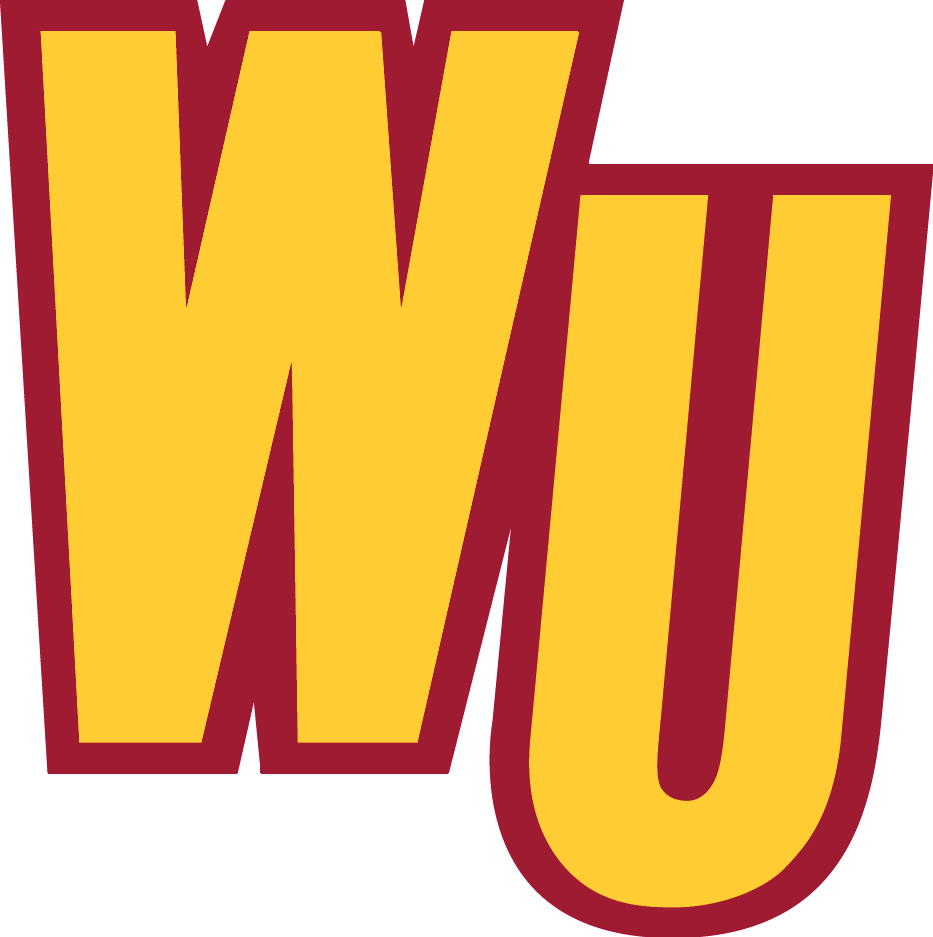

Big South Conference Regular Season and Tournament champion

NCAA tournament, Round of 64
- Conference: Big South Conference
- Record: 27–6 (15–1 Big South)
- Head coach: Gregg Marshall (7th season)
- Assistant coaches: Earl Grant; Paul Molinari; Randy Peele
- Home arena: Winthrop Coliseum

2004–05 Big South Conference men's basketball standings
	Conf.				Overall
Team	W		L	PCT	W		L	PCT
Winthrop †	15	–	1	.938	27	–	6	.818
Liberty	11	–	5	.688	13	–	15	.464
UNC Asheville	8	–	8	.500	11	–	17	.393
Birmingham–Southern	7	–	9	.438	16	–	14	.533
Charleston Southern	7	–	9	.438	13	–	17	.433
Radford	7	–	9	.438	12	–	16	.429
High Point	7	–	9	.438	13	–	18	.419
Coastal Carolina	7	–	9	.438	10	–	19	.345
VMI	3	–	13	.188	9	–	18	.333
† 2005 Big South tournament winner Rankings from AP Poll

The 2004–05 Winthrop Eagles men's basketball team represented Winthrop University in the 2004–05 NCAA Division I men's basketball season. The Eagles, led by head coach Gregg Marshall, played their home games at the Winthrop Coliseum in Rock Hill, South Carolina, as members of the Big South Conference.

After losing their conference opener, the Eagles went on a 15-game win streak to run away with the Big South Conference regular season title. They extended the streak to 18 games by winning the 2005 Big South tournament to earn the conference's automatic bid to the NCAA tournament. Playing as the No. 14 seed in the Albuquerque region, Winthrop's streak came to an end as they were beaten by No. 3 seed Gonzaga in the first round, 74–64.

== Roster ==
2004–05 Winthrop Eagles men's basketball team
Players
Coaches

Pos.	#	Name	Height	Weight	Year	Hometown
G/F	0	James Shuler	6 ft 6 in (1.98 m)	229 lb (104 kg)	Jr	Jonesville, Florida
F/C	5	Craig Bradshaw	6 ft 10 in (2.08 m)	242 lb (110 kg)	So	Wellington, New Zealand
G	10	Chris Gaynor	5 ft 10 in (1.78 m)	158 lb (72 kg)	Fr	Winston-Salem, North Carolina
G	11	Michael Jenkins	6 ft 3 in (1.91 m)	182 lb (83 kg)	Fr	Kinston, North Carolina
G	12	Torrell Martin	6 ft 5 in (1.96 m)	195 lb (88 kg)	So	Columbia, South Carolina
C	21	Jason Killeen	6 ft 10 in (2.08 m)	258 lb (117 kg)	Fr	Limerick, Ireland
F	22	Otis Daniels	6 ft 5 in (1.96 m)	215 lb (98 kg)	Jr	Greenwood, South Carolina
C	30	Billy Houston	6 ft 8 in (2.03 m)	236 lb (107 kg)	Jr	Fayetteville, North Carolina
F	31	Taj McCullough	6 ft 7 in (2.01 m)	217 lb (98 kg)	Fr	Atlanta, Georgia
F	32	Scott Draughn	6 ft 6 in (1.98 m)	215 lb (98 kg)	Fr	Hamden, Connecticut
C	33	Phillip Williams	6 ft 8 in (2.03 m)	215 lb (98 kg)	So	Cleveland, North Carolina

Head coach

- Gregg Marshall (Randolph–Macon)

Assistant coach(es)

- Earl Grant (Georgia College)
- Paul Molinari (Villanova)
- Randy Peele (Virginia Wesleyan)

Legend

- (C) Team captain
- (S) Suspended
- (I) Ineligible
- (W) Walk-on
- Injured
- Current redshirt

Roster

== Schedule and results ==
Date time, TV	Rank^{#}	Opponent^{#}	Result	Record	Site city, state
Non-conference Regular season
Nov 19, 2004*		vs. Arkansas; Paradise Jam	L 49–72	0–1	Sports and Fitness Center (1,287); Saint Thomas, U.S. Virgin Islands
Nov 20, 2004*		vs. Troy; Paradise Jam	W 89–80	1–1	Sports and Fitness Center (1,737); Saint Thomas, U.S. Virgin Islands
Nov 22, 2004*		vs. Austin Peay; Paradise Jam	W 52–36	2–1	Sports and Fitness Center (3,014); Saint Thomas, U.S. Virgin Islands
Nov 24, 2004*		at South Carolina	L 52–62	2–2	Colonial Center (7,717); Columbia, South Carolina
Nov 27, 2004*		Weber State	W 60–49	3–2	Winthrop Coliseum (1,387); Rock Hill, South Carolina
Nov 30, 2004*		at Providence	W 60–54	4–2	Dunkin Donuts Center (7,017); Providence, Rhode Island
Dec 30, 2004*		Barton	W 86–57	5–2	Winthrop Coliseum (1,562); Rock Hill, South Carolina
Dec 5, 2004*		Siena	W 67–58	6–2	Winthrop Coliseum (1,051); Rock Hill, South Carolina
Dec 17, 2004*		at East Carolina	W 70–55	7–2	Williams Arena at Minges Coliseum (4,149); Greenville, North Carolina
Dec 20, 2004*		at Portland	L 64–70	7–3	Chiles Center (941); Portland, Oregon
Dec 22, 2004*		at Oregon	L 56–71	7–4	McArthur Court (8,813); Eugene, Oregon
Dec 30, 2004*		Georgia College	W 69–56	8–4	Winthrop Coliseum (1,519); Rock Hill, South Carolina
Jan 2, 2005		Ferrum	W 90–62	9–4	Winthrop Coliseum (877); Rock Hill, South Carolina
Big South Regular season
Jan 5, 2005		at Coastal Carolina	L 68–76	9–5 (0–1)	Kimbel Arena (827); Conway, South Carolina
Jan 8, 2005		Liberty	W 75–73 ^{OT}	10–5 (1–1)	Winthrop Coliseum (1,967); Rock Hill, South Carolina
Jan 10, 2005		at UNC Asheville	W 78–70	11–5 (2–1)	Charlie Justice Center (1,131); Asheville, North Carolina
Jan 15, 2005		Radford	W 74–54	12–5 (3–1)	Winthrop Coliseum (2,864); Rock Hill, South Carolina
Jan 19, 2005		at Birmingham—Southern	W 65–57	13–5 (4–1)	Bill Battle Coliseum (922); Birmingham, Alabama
Jan 22, 2005		Coastal Carolina	W 80–66	14–5 (5–1)	Winthrop Coliseum (3,027); Rock Hill, South Carolina
Jan 25, 2005*		Charleston Southern	W 58–45	15–5 (6–1)	Winthrop Coliseum (1,961); Rock Hill, South Carolina
Jan 31, 2005*		VMI	W 69–44	16–5 (7–1)	Winthrop Coliseum (2,216); Rock Hill, South Carolina
Feb 7, 2005*		UNC Asheville	W 67–60	17–5 (8–1)	Winthrop Coliseum (2,262); Rock Hill, South Carolina
Feb 8, 2005		at High Point	W 72–55	18–5 (9–1)	Millis Center (1,327); High Point, North Carolina
Feb 10, 2005		at Liberty	W 69–61	19–5 (10–1)	Vines Center (6,874); Lynchburg, Virginia
Feb 12, 2005		Birmingham–Southern	W 55–41	20–5 (11–1)	Winthrop Coliseum (3,043); Rock Hill, South Carolina
Feb 16, 2005		at Radford	W 65–55	21–5 (12–1)	Donald N. Dedmon Center (1,000); Radford, Virginia
Feb 19, 2005		High Point	W 74–66	22–5 (13–1)	Winthrop Coliseum (5,254); Rock Hill, South Carolina
Feb 23, 2005		at VMI	W 63–48	23–5 (14–1)	Cameron Hall (982); Lexington, Virginia
Feb 26, 2005		at Charleston Southern	W 65–62 ^{OT}	24–5 (15–1)	Buccaneer Field House (720); North Charleston, South Carolina
Big South Tournament
Mar 1, 2005*		Coastal Carolina; Quarterfinals	W 74–62	25–5	Winthrop Coliseum (2,746); Rock Hill, South Carolina
Mar 3, 2005*		Birmingham-Southern; Semifinals	W 78–64	26–5	Winthrop Coliseum (3,034); Rock Hill, South Carolina
Mar 5, 2005*		Charleston Southern; Championship game	W 68–46	27–5	Winthrop Coliseum (4,468); Rock Hill, South Carolina
NCAA Tournament
Mar 17, 2005*	(14 ABQ)	vs. (3 ABQ) No. 10 Gonzaga; First round	L 64–74	27–6	McKale Center (13,751); Tucson, Arizona
*Non-conference game. ^{#}Rankings from AP Poll. (#) Tournament seedings in parentheses. All times are in Eastern Time.
