= 1999–2000 Winthrop Eagles men's basketball team =

American college basketball season

1999–2000 Winthrop Eagles men's basketball
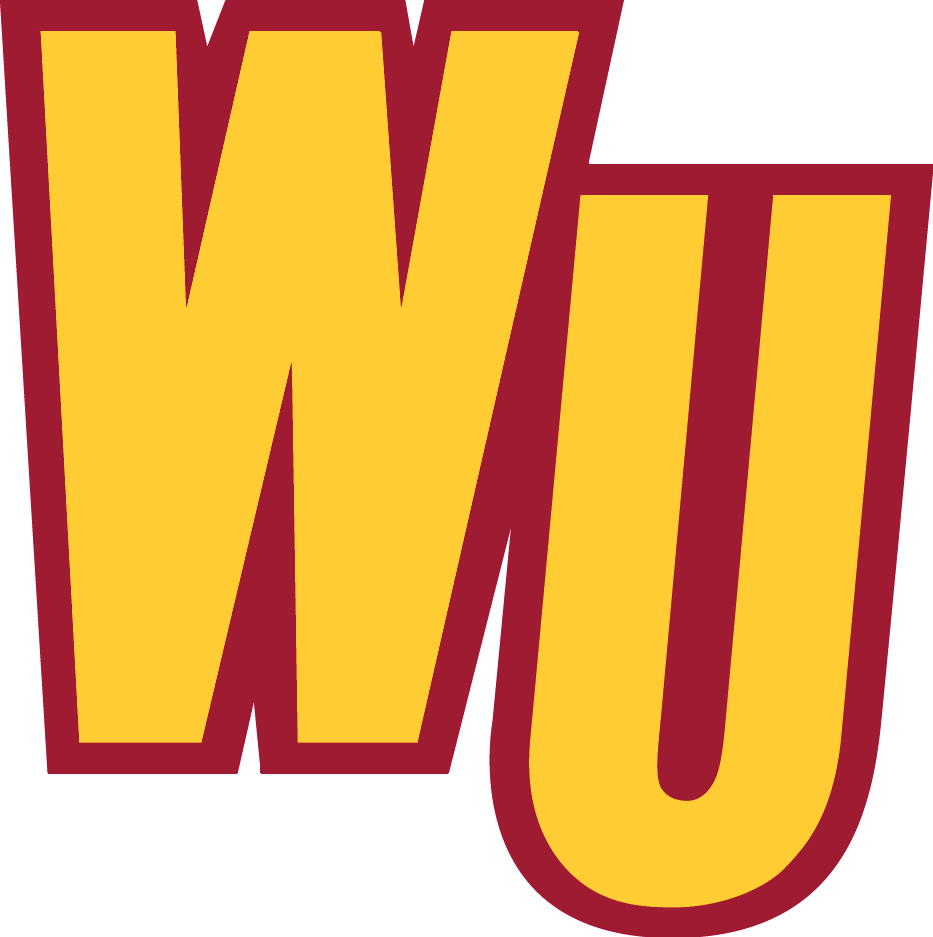

Big South tournament champions

NCAA tournament, first round
- Conference: Big South Conference
- Record: 21–9 (11–3 Big South)
- Head coach: Gregg Marshall (2nd season)
- Home arena: Winthrop Coliseum

1999–2000 Big South Conference men's basketball standings
	Conf.				Overall
Team	W		L	PCT	W		L	PCT
Radford	12	–	2	.857	18	–	10	.643
Winthrop †	11	–	3	.786	21	–	9	.700
Coastal Carolina	7	–	7	.500	10	–	18	.357
UNC Asheville	7	–	7	.500	11	–	18	.379
Elon*	7	–	7	.500	13	–	15	.464
High Point*	5	–	9	.357	11	–	17	.393
Liberty	4	–	10	.286	14	–	14	.500
Charleston Southern	3	–	11	.214	8	–	21	.276
† 2000 Big South tournament winner Rankings from AP Poll; *Ineligible for conference tournament

The 1999–2000 Winthrop Eagles men's basketball team represented Winthrop University during the 1999–2000 college basketball season. This was head coach Gregg Marshall's second season at Winthrop. The Eagles competed in the Big South Conference and played their home games at Winthrop Coliseum. They finished the season 21–9, 11–3 in Big South play to finish second in the conference regular season standings. They won the 2000 Big South Conference men's basketball tournament to receive the conference's automatic bid to the 2000 NCAA Division I men's basketball tournament as No. 14 seed in the West region. The Eagles lost to No. 3 seed Oklahoma in the opening round.

== Roster ==
1999–2000 Winthrop Eagles men's basketball team
Players
Coaches

Pos.	#	Name	Height	Weight	Year	Previous school	Hometown
G		Tyson Waterman	6 ft 0 in (1.83 m)	—	Sr
F	30	Greg Lewis	6 ft 6 in (1.98 m)	215 lb (98 kg)	Jr	Howard College	Akron, Ohio

Head coach

- Gregg Marshall

Assistant coach(es)

Legend

- (C) Team captain
- (S) Suspended
- (I) Ineligible
- (W) Walk-on
- Injured
- Current redshirt

Roster

== Schedule and results ==
- All times are Eastern

Date time, TV	Rank^{#}	Opponent^{#}	Result	Record	Site (attendance) city, state
Non-conference regular season
Nov 20, 1999*		Lee (TN)	W 97–73	1–0	Winthrop Coliseum (1,179); Rock Hill, South Carolina
Nov 23, 1999*		Central Florida	W 78–54	2–0	Winthrop Coliseum (1,166); Rock Hill, South Carolina
Nov 27, 1999*		The Citadel	W 71–51	3–0	Winthrop Coliseum (1,168); Rock Hill, South Carolina
Dec 2, 1999*		at Georgia Southern	W 80–72	4–0	Hanner Fieldhouse (1,769); Statesboro, Georgia
Dec 4, 1999*		at Dayton	L 49–76	4–1	University of Dayton Arena (11,606); Dayton, Ohio
Dec 7, 1999*		at No. 21 Maryland	L 65–76 ^{OT}	4–2	Cole Fieldhouse (10,107); College Park, Maryland
Dec 16, 1999*		at Campbell	L 58–62	4–3	Carter Gymnasium (359); Buies Creek, North Carolina
Dec 18, 1999*		at Clemson	L 59–64	4–4	Littlejohn Coliseum (8,000); Clemson, South Carolina
Dec 21, 1999*		UNC Greensboro	L 88–93 ^{2OT}	4–5	Winthrop Coliseum (1,056); Rock Hill, South Carolina
Dec 29, 1999*		USC Aiken	W 87–63	5–5	Winthrop Coliseum (910); Rock Hill, South Carolina
Jan 4, 2000*		at Missouri	W 51–46	6–5	Hearnes Center (6,766); Columbia, Missouri
Jan 7, 2000*		Lees-McRae	W 86–54	7–5	Winthrop Coliseum (916); Rock Hill, South Carolina
Jan 10, 2000*		William & Mary	W 71–64	8–5	Winthrop Coliseum (1,560); Rock Hill, South Carolina
Big South Regular Season
Jan 15, 2000		at Radford	L 52–55	8–6 (0–1)	Donald N. Dedmon Center (1,873); Radford, Virginia
Jan 17, 2000		at Liberty	W 73–71	9–6 (1–1)	Vines Center (4,173); Lynchburg, Virginia
Jan 22, 2000		High Point	W 75–57	10–6 (2–1)	Winthrop Coliseum (1,236); Rock Hill, South Carolina
Jan 27, 2000		Coastal Carolina	W 83–70	11–6 (3–1)	Winthrop Coliseum (1,181); Rock Hill, South Carolina
Jan 29, 2000		at UNC Asheville	L 63–64	11–7 (3–2)	Justice Center (850); Asheville, North Carolina
Feb 2, 2000		Charleston Southern	W 75–41	12–7 (4–2)	Winthrop Coliseum (1,276); Rock Hill, South Carolina
Feb 5, 2000		Liberty	W 80–63	13–7 (5–2)	Winthrop Coliseum (1,921); Rock Hill, South Carolina
Feb 9, 2000		Radford	W 81–78	14–7 (6–2)	Winthrop Coliseum (2,011); Rock Hill, South Carolina
Feb 12, 2000		at High Point	W 60–55	15–7 (7–2)	Millis Center (1,586); High Point, North Carolina
Feb 14, 2000		at Elon	W 82–68	16–7 (8–2)	Alumni Gym (757); Elon, North Carolina
Feb 16, 2000		Elon	W 87–82 ^{OT}	17–7 (9–2)	Winthrop Coliseum (1,206); Rock Hill, South Carolina
Feb 19, 2000		at Charleston Southern	W 79–65	18–7 (10–2)	Buccaneer Field House (1,389); North Charleston, South Carolina
Feb 23, 2000		at Coastal Carolina	L 58–73	18–8 (10–3)	Kimbel Arena (1,133); Conway, South Carolina
Feb 26, 2000		UNC Asheville	W 90–50	19–8 (11–3)	Winthrop Coliseum (3,266); Rock Hill, South Carolina
Big South tournament
Mar 3, 2000*		vs. Charleston Southern; Semifinals	W 90–65	20–8	Asheville Civic Center (3,044); Asheville, North Carolina
Mar 4, 2000*		at UNC Asheville; Championship game	W 75–62	21–8	Asheville Civic Center (4,226); Asheville, North Carolina
NCAA tournament
Mar 16, 2000*	(14 W)	vs. (3 W) No. 12 Oklahoma; First Round	L 50–74	21–9	McKale Center (13,500); Tucson, Arizona
*Non-conference game. ^{#}Rankings from AP poll. (#) Tournament seedings in parentheses. W=West. All times are in Eastern.
