= 2005–06 Winthrop Eagles men's basketball team =

American college basketball season

2005–06 Winthrop Eagles men's basketball
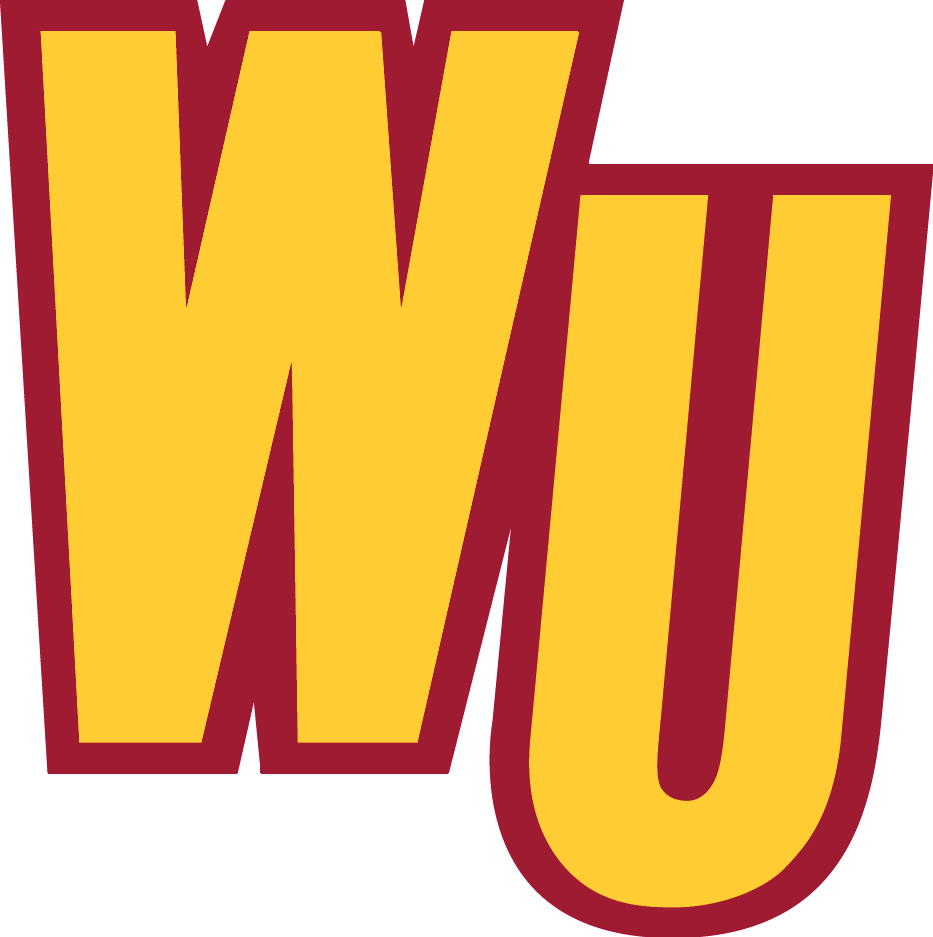

Big South Conference Regular Season and Tournament champion

NCAA tournament, Round of 64
- Conference: Big South Conference
- Record: 23–8 (13–3 Big South)
- Head coach: Gregg Marshall (8th season)
- Assistant coaches: Earl Grant; Paul Molinari; Randy Peele
- Home arena: Winthrop Coliseum

2005–06 Big South Conference men's basketball standings
	Conf.				Overall
Team	W		L	PCT	W		L	PCT
Winthrop †	13	–	3	.813	23	–	8	.742
Birmingham–Southern	12	–	4	.750	19	–	9	.679
Coastal Carolina	12	–	4	.750	20	–	10	.667
Radford	9	–	7	.563	16	–	13	.552
High Point	8	–	8	.500	16	–	13	.552
Charleston Southern	7	–	9	.438	13	–	16	.448
UNC Asheville	6	–	10	.375	9	–	19	.321
Liberty	3	–	13	.188	7	–	23	.233
VMI	2	–	14	.125	7	–	20	.259
† 2006 Big South tournament winner Rankings from AP Poll

The 2005–06 Winthrop Eagles men's basketball team represented Winthrop University in the 2005–06 NCAA Division I men's basketball season. The Eagles, led by head coach Gregg Marshall, played their home games at the Winthrop Coliseum in Rock Hill, South Carolina, as members of the Big South Conference. The Eagles won the Big South Conference regular season title, and won the 2006 Big South tournament, earning an automatic bid to the NCAA tournament as the 15th seed in the Washington, DC Bracket. Winthrop was beaten by second-seeded Tennessee in the first round, 63–61, on a last-second basket by Tennessee's Chris Lofton.

== Roster ==
2005–06 Winthrop Eagles men's basketball team
Players
Coaches

Pos.	#	Name	Height	Weight	Year	Hometown
G/F	0	James Shuler	6 ft 6 in (1.98 m)	229 lb (104 kg)	Sr	Jonesville, Florida
G/F	3	Mantoris Robinson	6 ft 5 in (1.96 m)	191 lb (87 kg)	Fr	Charlotte, North Carolina
F/C	5	Craig Bradshaw	6 ft 10 in (2.08 m)	242 lb (110 kg)	Jr	Wellington, New Zealand
G	10	Chris Gaynor	5 ft 10 in (1.78 m)	158 lb (72 kg)	So	Winston-Salem, North Carolina
G	11	Michael Jenkins	6 ft 3 in (1.91 m)	182 lb (83 kg)	So	Kinston, North Carolina
G	12	Torrell Martin	6 ft 5 in (1.96 m)	195 lb (88 kg)	Jr	Columbia, South Carolina
C	21	Jason Killeen	6 ft 10 in (2.08 m)	258 lb (117 kg)	So	Limerick, Ireland
F	22	Otis Daniels	6 ft 5 in (1.96 m)	215 lb (98 kg)	Sr	Greenwood, South Carolina
G	24	De'Andre Adams	5 ft 8 in (1.73 m)	156 lb (71 kg)	Fr	Austell, Georgia
C	30	Billy Houston	6 ft 8 in (2.03 m)	236 lb (107 kg)	Sr	Fayetteville, North Carolina
F	31	Taj McCullough	6 ft 7 in (2.01 m)	217 lb (98 kg)	So	Atlanta, Georgia
F	32	Scott Draughn	6 ft 6 in (1.98 m)	215 lb (98 kg)	So	Hamden, Connecticut
C	33	Phillip Williams	6 ft 8 in (2.03 m)	215 lb (98 kg)	Jr	Cleveland, North Carolina
F	44	Jonathan Rice	6 ft 5 in (1.96 m)	205 lb (93 kg)	Fr	Columbia, South Carolina

Head coach

- Gregg Marshall (Randolph–Macon)

Assistant coach(es)

- Earl Grant (Georgia College)
- Paul Molinari (Villanova)
- Randy Peele (Virginia Wesleyan)

Legend

- (C) Team captain
- (S) Suspended
- (I) Ineligible
- (W) Walk-on
- Injured
- Current redshirt

Roster
Last update: January 6, 2023

== Schedule and results ==
Date time, TV	Rank^{#}	Opponent^{#}	Result	Record	Site city, state
Regular season
November 18, 2005*; 6:30 pm		vs. IUPUI; Pepsi Blue & Gold Classic Semifinal	W 73–50	1–0	Bradley Center (11,281); Milwaukee, WI
November 19, 2005*; 8:00 pm		at Marquette; Pepsi Blue & Gold Classic Championship	W 71–64	2–0	Bradley Center (11,119); Milwaukee, WI
November 26, 2005*; 7:00 pm		Portland	W 77–46	3–0	Winthrop Coliseum (2,927); Rock Hill, SC
November 29, 2005*; 7:00 pm		Newberry	W 79–77	4–0	Winthrop Coliseum (2,015); Rock Hill, SC
December 3, 2005*; 8:00 pm		at No. 18 Alabama	L 57–60	4–1	Coleman Coliseum (8,481); Tuscaloosa, AL
December 14, 2005*; 7:30 pm		at South Carolina	L 54–68	4–2	Colonial Center (7,053); Columbia, SC
December 18, 2005*; 3:00 pm		East Carolina	W 70–48	5–2	Winthrop Coliseum (1,824); Rock Hill, SC
December 22, 2005*; 7:00 pm		Palm Beach Atlantic	W 101–49	6–2	Winthrop Coliseum (2,032); Rock Hill, SC
December 29, 2005*; 8:00 pm		at Auburn	L 62–64	6–3	Beard–Eaves–Memorial Coliseum (3,828); Auburn, AL
January 5, 2006; 7:00 pm		Birmingham–Southern	W 84–43	7–3 (1–0)	Winthrop Coliseum (2,519); Rock Hill, SC
January 8, 2006*; 2:00 pm		at No. 4 Memphis	L 63–73	7–4	FedExForum (14,171); Memphis, TN
January 11, 2006; 7:00 pm		UNC Asheville	W 99–84	8–4 (2–0)	Winthrop Coliseum (2,698); Rock Hill, SC
January 14, 2006; 7:00 pm		at Radford	W 90–75	9–4 (3–0)	Dedmon Center (1,500); Radford, VA
January 16, 2006; 7:00 pm		at Charleston Southern	W 79–61	10–4 (4–0)	CSU Field House (886); North Charleston, SC
January 19, 2006; 7:00 pm		Liberty	W 67–47	11–4 (5–0)	Winthrop Coliseum (3,067); Rock Hill, SC
January 21, 2006; 7:00 pm		at High Point	W 70–67	12–4 (6–0)	Millis Athletic Center (2,441); High Point, NC
January 24, 2006; 7:00 pm		Coastal Carolina	L 57–64	12–5 (6–1)	Winthrop Coliseum (3,180); Rock Hill, SC
January 28, 2006; 4:00 pm		Charleston Southern	W 76–59	13–5 (7–1)	Winthrop Coliseum (3,570); Rock Hill, SC
January 30, 2006; 7:00 pm		at VMI	W 74–69	14–5 (8–1)	Cameron Hall (1,849); Lexington, VA
February 4, 2006; 2:00 pm		at Coastal Carolina	L 50–64	14–6 (8–2)	Kimbel Arena (1,084); Conway, SC
February 8, 2006; 7:00 pm		VMI	W 98–65	15–6 (9–2)	Winthrop Coliseum (2,730); Rock Hill, SC
February 11, 2006; 4:00 pm		Radford	W 71–44	16–6 (10–2)	Winthrop Coliseum (4,930); Rock Hill, SC
February 15, 2006; 7:00 pm		at UNC Asheville	W 78–65	17–6 (11–2)	Justice Center (905); Asheville, NC
February 18, 2006*; 4:00 pm		Northern Illinois; ESPN BracketBusters	W 98–97 ^{2OT}	18–6	Winthrop Coliseum (2,559); Rock Hill, SC
February 20, 2006; 7:00 pm		at Liberty	L 71–78	18–7 (11–3)	Vines Center (1,426); Lynchburg, VA
February 23, 2006; 7:00 pm		High Point	W 94–78	19–7 (12–3)	Winthrop Coliseum (2,930); Rock Hill, SC
February 25, 2006; 8:00 pm		at Birmingham–Southern	W 56–43	20–7 (13–3)	Bill Battle Coliseum (2,453); Birmingham, AL
Big South Tournament
February 28, 2006; 7:30 pm	(1)	(8) Liberty; Big South Quarterfinals	W 93–52	21–7	Winthrop Coliseum (2,434); Rock Hill, SC
March 2, 2006; 7:00 pm	(1)	(5) High Point; Big South Semifinals	W 77–65	22–7	Winthrop Coliseum (3,768); Rock Hill, SC
March 4, 2006; 12:00 pm	(1)	(2) Coastal Carolina; Big South Championship	W 51–50	23–7	Winthrop Coliseum (5,076); Rock Hill, SC
NCAA Tournament
March 16, 2006; 3:00 pm	(15 W)	vs. (2 W) No. 18 Tennessee; NCAA First Round	L 61–63	23–8	Greensboro Coliseum (22,073); Greensboro, NC
*Non-conference game. ^{#}Rankings from AP Poll. (#) Tournament seedings in parentheses. All times are in Eastern Time.
