= 2007 Big South Conference men's basketball tournament =

- Classification: Division I
- Season: 2006–07
- Teams: 8
- Site: campus sites
- Finals site: Winthrop Coliseum; Rock Hill, SC
- Champions: Winthrop Eagles (8th title)
- Winning coach: Gregg Marshall (5th title)
- MVP: Craig Bradshaw (Winthrop)

2006–07 Big South Conference men's basketball standings
	Conf.				Overall
Team	W		L	PCT	W		L	PCT
No. 22 Winthrop †	14	–	0	1.000	29	–	5	.853
High Point	11	–	3	.786	22	–	10	.688
Liberty	8	–	6	.571	14	–	17	.452
UNC Asheville	6	–	8	.429	12	–	19	.387
Coastal Carolina	7	–	7	.500	15	–	15	.500
VMI	5	–	9	.357	14	–	19	.424
Radford	3	–	11	.214	8	–	22	.267
Charleston Southern	2	–	12	.143	8	–	22	.267
† 2007 Big South tournament winner Rankings from AP Poll

The 2007 Big South Conference men's basketball tournament was the postseason tournament for the Big South Conference from February 27 to March 3, 2007. The tournament was held at campus sites, with the higher seeds serving as host.

The Winthrop Eagles won the tournament, their third straight of what would be four consecutive titles.

== Format ==
The top eight eligible teams can qualify for the tournament. The seeds are judged by conference winning percentage. The winner receives an automatic bid to the NCAA Tournament.

== Bracket ==
Quarterfinals; Tuesday, February 27
1	Winthrop	72
8	Charleston Southern	42
4	Coastal Carolina	64
5	UNC Asheville	77
2	High Point	90
7	Radford	73
3	Liberty	78
6	VMI	79

Semifinals; Thursday, March 1
1	Winthrop	79
5	UNC Asheville	60
2	High Point	81
6	VMI	91

Final; Saturday, March 3
1	Winthrop	84
6	VMI	81

First round held at campus sites of higher seeds
Semifinals and final held at Winthrop Coliseum, Rock Hill, SC
