= 2000–01 Winthrop Eagles men's basketball team =

American college basketball season

2000–01 Winthrop Eagles men's basketball
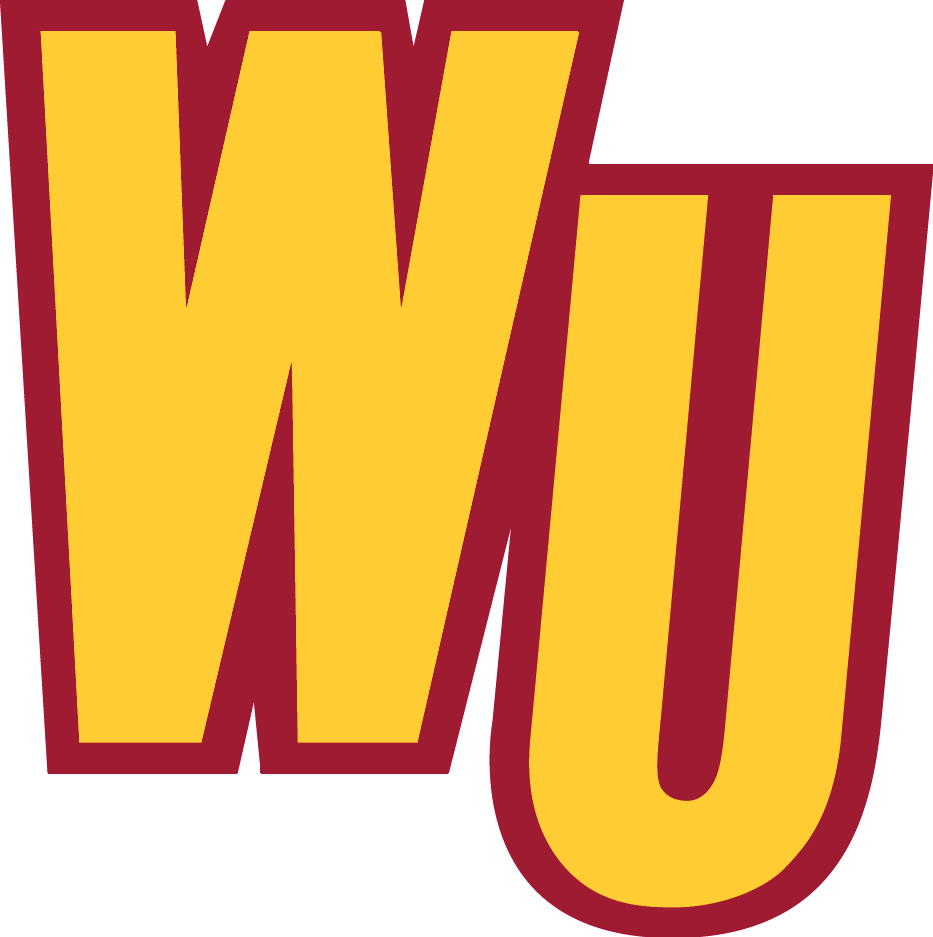

Big South tournament champions

NCAA tournament, Play-in game
- Conference: Big South Conference
- Record: 18–13 (11–3 Big South)
- Head coach: Gregg Marshall (3rd season)
- Home arena: Winthrop Coliseum

2000–01 Big South Conference men's basketball standings
	Conf.				Overall
Team	W		L	PCT	W		L	PCT
Radford	12	–	2	.857	19	–	10	.655
Winthrop †	11	–	3	.786	18	–	13	.581
UNC Asheville	9	–	5	.643	15	–	13	.536
Coastal Carolina	6	–	8	.429	8	–	20	.286
Charleston Southern	6	–	8	.429	10	–	19	.345
Liberty	5	–	9	.357	15	–	13	.536
Elon*	4	–	10	.286	9	–	20	.310
High Point*	3	–	11	.214	8	–	20	.286
† 2001 Big South tournament winner Rankings from AP Poll; *Ineligible for conference tournament

The 2000–01 Winthrop Eagles men's basketball team represented Winthrop University during the 2000–01 college basketball season. This was head coach Gregg Marshall's third season at Winthrop. The Eagles competed in the Big South Conference and played their home games at Winthrop Coliseum. They finished the season 18–13, 11–3 in Big South play to finish second in the conference regular season standings. They won the 2001 Big South Conference men's basketball tournament to receive the conference's automatic bid to the 2001 NCAA Division I men's basketball tournament. Playing as one of two No. 16 seeds in the Midwest region, the Eagles lost to fellow No. 16 seed Northwestern State in the play-in game

== Roster ==
1999–2000 Winthrop Eagles men's basketball team
Players
Coaches

Pos.	#	Name	Height	Weight	Year	Previous school	Hometown
G		Tyson Waterman	6 ft 0 in (1.83 m)	—	Sr
F	30	Greg Lewis	6 ft 6 in (1.98 m)	215 lb (98 kg)	Jr	Howard College	Akron, Ohio

Head coach

- Gregg Marshall

Assistant coach(es)

Legend

- (C) Team captain
- (S) Suspended
- (I) Ineligible
- (W) Walk-on
- Injured
- Current redshirt

Roster

== Schedule and results ==
Date time, TV	Rank^{#}	Opponent^{#}	Result	Record	Site (attendance) city, state
Non-conference regular season
Nov 10, 2000*		at No. 6 North Carolina	L 61–66	0–1	Dean Smith Center; Chapel Hill, North Carolina
Big South Regular Season
Feb 24, 2001*		at UNC Asheville	W 71–58	16–12 (11–3)	Justice Center; Asheville, North Carolina
Big South tournament
Mar 2, 2001*		vs. Liberty; Semifinals	W 67–62 ^{2OT}	17–12	Roanoke Civic Center; Roanoke, Virginia
Mar 3, 2001*		vs. Radford; Championship game	W 67–65 ^{OT}	18–12	Roanoke Civic Center; Roanoke, Virginia
NCAA tournament
Mar 13, 2001*	(16 MW)	vs. (16 MW) Northwestern State; Play-in game	L 67–71	18–13	University of Dayton Arena; Dayton, Ohio
*Non-conference game. ^{#}Rankings from AP poll. (#) Tournament seedings in parentheses. MW=Midwest. All times are in Eastern.
