= 2008 Big South Conference men's basketball tournament =

- Classification: Division I
- Season: 2007–08
- Teams: 8
- Quarterfinals site: campus sites
- Semifinals site: Justice Center; Asheville, North Carolina
- Finals site: Justice Center; Asheville, North Carolina
- Champions: Winthrop (9th title)
- Winning coach: Randy Peele (2nd title)
- MVP: Michael Jenkins (Winthrop)

2007–08 Big South men's basketball standings
	Conf.				Overall
Team	W		L	PCT	W		L	PCT
UNC Asheville	10	–	4	.714	23	–	10	.697
Winthrop †	10	–	4	.714	22	–	12	.647
High Point	8	–	6	.571	17	–	14	.548
Liberty	7	–	7	.500	16	–	16	.500
VMI	6	–	8	.429	14	–	15	.483
Coastal Carolina	6	–	8	.429	13	–	15	.464
Radford	5	–	9	.357	10	–	20	.333
Charleston Southern	4	–	10	.286	10	–	20	.333
† 2008 Big South tournament winner As of March 8, 2008; Rankings from AP Poll

The 2008 Big South Conference men's basketball tournament took place March 4–8, 2008.

== Format ==
The semifinals were held at the Justice Center in Asheville, North Carolina. The quarterfinals and finals were held at the home court of the better seed.

== Bracket ==
Quarterfinals; March 4
1	UNC Asheville	87
8	Charleston Southern	63
4	Liberty	103
5	VMI	88
2	Winthrop	76
7	Radford	45
3	High Point	59
6	Coastal Carolina	56

Semifinals; March 6
1	UNC Asheville	75
4	Liberty	57
2	Winthrop	61
3	High Point	53

Finals; March 8
1	UNC Asheville	48
2	Winthrop	66
