= 1996 Big South Conference men's basketball tournament =

- Classification: Division I
- Season: 1995–96
- Teams: 8
- Site: Vines Center; Lynchburg, VA
- Champions: UNC Greensboro (1st title)
- Winning coach: Randy Peele (1st title)
- MVP: Scott Hartzell (UNC Greensboro)

1995–96 Big South Conference men's basketball standings
	Conf.				Overall
Team	W		L	PCT	W		L	PCT
UNC Greensboro †	11	–	3	.786	20	–	10	.667
Liberty	9	–	5	.643	17	–	12	.586
UNC Asheville	9	–	5	.643	18	–	10	.643
Charleston Southern	9	–	5	.643	15	–	13	.536
Radford	8	–	6	.571	14	–	13	.519
Winthrop	6	–	8	.429	7	–	19	.269
UMBC	3	–	11	.214	5	–	22	.185
Coastal Carolina	1	–	13	.071	5	–	21	.192
† 1996 Big South tournament winner Rankings from AP Poll

The 1996 Big South Conference men's basketball tournament took place February 29–March 2, 1996, at the Vines Center in Lynchburg, Virginia, the home of the Liberty Flames. For the first time in their school history, the UNC Greensboro Spartans won the tournament, led by head coach Randy Peele.

== Format ==
All eight teams participated in the tournament, hosted at the Vines Center. Teams were seeded by conference winning percentage.

== Bracket ==
Quarterfinals; February 29
1	UNC Greensboro	78
8	Coastal Carolina	67
4	Charleston Southern	55
5	Radford	52
3	UNC Asheville	69
6	Winthrop	61
2	Liberty	74
7	UMBC	52

Semifinals; March 1
1	UNC Greensboro	69
4	Charleston Southern	60
2	Liberty	73
3	UNC Asheville	60

Finals; March 2
1	UNC Greensboro	79
2	Liberty	53

* Asterisk indicates overtime game

- Source

== All-Tournament Team ==
- Scott Hartzel, UNC Greensboro
- Eric Cuthrell, UNC Greensboro
- Jeremy Davis, UNC Greensboro
- Peter Aluma, Liberty
- Marcus White, Liberty
