= 2005 Big South Conference men's basketball tournament =

- Classification: Division I
- Season: 2004–05
- Teams: 8
- Site: Campus sites
- Finals site: Winthrop Coliseum; Rock Hill, SC
- Champions: Winthrop (6th title)
- Winning coach: Gregg Marshall (5th title)
- MVP: Torrell Martin (Winthrop)
- Attendance: 16,212

2004–05 Big South Conference men's basketball standings
	Conf.				Overall
Team	W		L	PCT	W		L	PCT
Winthrop †	15	–	1	.938	27	–	6	.818
Liberty	11	–	5	.688	13	–	15	.464
UNC Asheville	8	–	8	.500	11	–	17	.393
Birmingham–Southern	7	–	9	.438	16	–	14	.533
Charleston Southern	7	–	9	.438	13	–	17	.433
Radford	7	–	9	.438	12	–	16	.429
High Point	7	–	9	.438	13	–	18	.419
Coastal Carolina	7	–	9	.438	10	–	19	.345
VMI	3	–	13	.188	9	–	18	.333
† 2005 Big South tournament winner Rankings from AP Poll

The 2005 Big South Conference men's basketball tournament took place March 1–5, 2005, at campus sites. The tournament was won by the Winthrop Eagles, their first of what would become four consecutive titles, led by head coach Gregg Marshall. They defeated the #7 Charleston Southern Buccaneers in the championship game 68–46.

== Format ==
The top eight of the conference's nine teams were eligible for the tournament, seeded by conference winning percentage. All games were hosted at campus sites, with home-field advantage going to the higher seed. This gave the #1 seed Winthrop home-court advantage throughout the tournament.

== Bracket ==
Quarterfinals; March 1
1	Winthrop	74
8	Coastal Carolina	62
4	Birmingham–Southern	69
5	Radford	40
3	UNC Asheville	93
6	High Point	98
2	Liberty	60
7	Charleston Southern	66

Semifinals; March 3
1	Winthrop	78
4	Birmingham–Southern	64
6	High Point	55
7	Charleston Southern	58

Finals; March 5
1	Winthrop	68
7	Charleston Southern	46

- Source

== All-Tournament Team ==
- Torrell Martin, Winthrop
- James Shuler, Winthrop
- Kurtis Rice, Charleston Southern
- Terrell Brown, Charleston Southern
- Jakob Sigurdarson, Birmingham–Southern
