= 1995–96 UMBC Retrievers men's basketball team =

American college basketball season

1995–96 UMBC Retrievers men's basketball
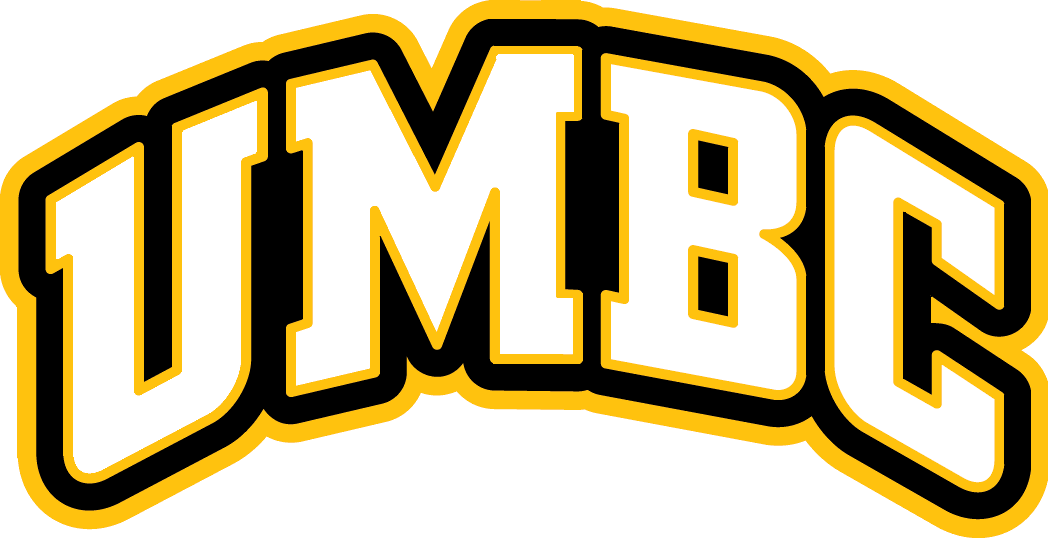
- Conference: Big South Conference
- Record: 5–22 (3–11 BSC)
- Head coach: Tom Sullivan (1st season)
- Home arena: Retriever Activities Center

1995–96 Big South Conference men's basketball standings
	Conf.				Overall
Team	W		L	PCT	W		L	PCT
UNC Greensboro †	11	–	3	.786	20	–	10	.667
Liberty	9	–	5	.643	17	–	12	.586
UNC Asheville	9	–	5	.643	18	–	10	.643
Charleston Southern	9	–	5	.643	15	–	13	.536
Radford	8	–	6	.571	14	–	13	.519
Winthrop	6	–	8	.429	7	–	19	.269
UMBC	3	–	11	.214	5	–	22	.185
Coastal Carolina	1	–	13	.071	5	–	21	.192
† 1996 Big South tournament winner Rankings from AP Poll

The 1995–96 UMBC Retrievers men's basketball team represented University of Maryland, Baltimore County in the 1995–96 NCAA Division I men's basketball season. The team played in the Big South Conference (BSC) and led by head coach Tom Sullivan in his first year.

== Schedule and results ==
Date time, TV	Rank^{#}	Opponent^{#}	Result	Record	Site (attendance) city, state
Regular season
*		at North Texas	L 67–82	0–1	
*		at Texas A&M	L 47–75	0–2	G. Rollie White Coliseum; College Station, TX
*		at Loyola	W 56–53	1–2	
*		Rider	L 68–69	1–3	
		at Morgan State	L 56–57	1–4	
		at Boston College	L 56–78	1–5	Conte Forum; Chestnut Hill, MA
		at Boston University	L 56–70	1–6	
		St. Peter’s	L 58–70	1–7	
		at Central Connecticut	L 62–63	1–8	William H. Detrick Gymnasium; New Britain, CT
		at Florida State	L 56–80	1–9	Donald L. Tucker Civic Center; Tallahassee, FL
		Winthrop	L 63–69	1–10 (0–1)	
		Liberty	L 63–79	1–11 (0–2)	
		Charleston Southern	L 38–54	1–12 (0–3)	
		Lehigh	W 72–56	2–12	
		at Radford	L 48–66	2–13 (0–4)	
		at UNC Asheville	L 73–76	2–14 (0–5)	
		at UNC Greensboro	L 65–77	2–15 (0–6)	
		Coastal Carolina	W 73–67	3–15 (1–6)	
		Radford	L 63–73	3–16 (1–7)	
		at Liberty	L 48–51	3–17 (1–8)	
		at Charleston Southern	L 46–68	3–18 (1–9)	
		at Winthrop	L 63–73	3–19 (1–10)	
		UNC Asheville	W 62–61	4–19 (2–10)	
		Drexel	L 55–87	4–20	
		UNC Greensboro	L 49–68	4–21 (2–11)	
		at Coastal Carolina	W 80–75	5–21 (2–12)	
		at Liberty	L 52–74	5–22	
*Non-conference game. ^{#}Rankings from AP Poll. (#) Tournament seedings in parentheses. All times are in Eastern.
