= 2001–02 Winthrop Eagles men's basketball team =

American college basketball season

2001–02 Winthrop Eagles men's basketball
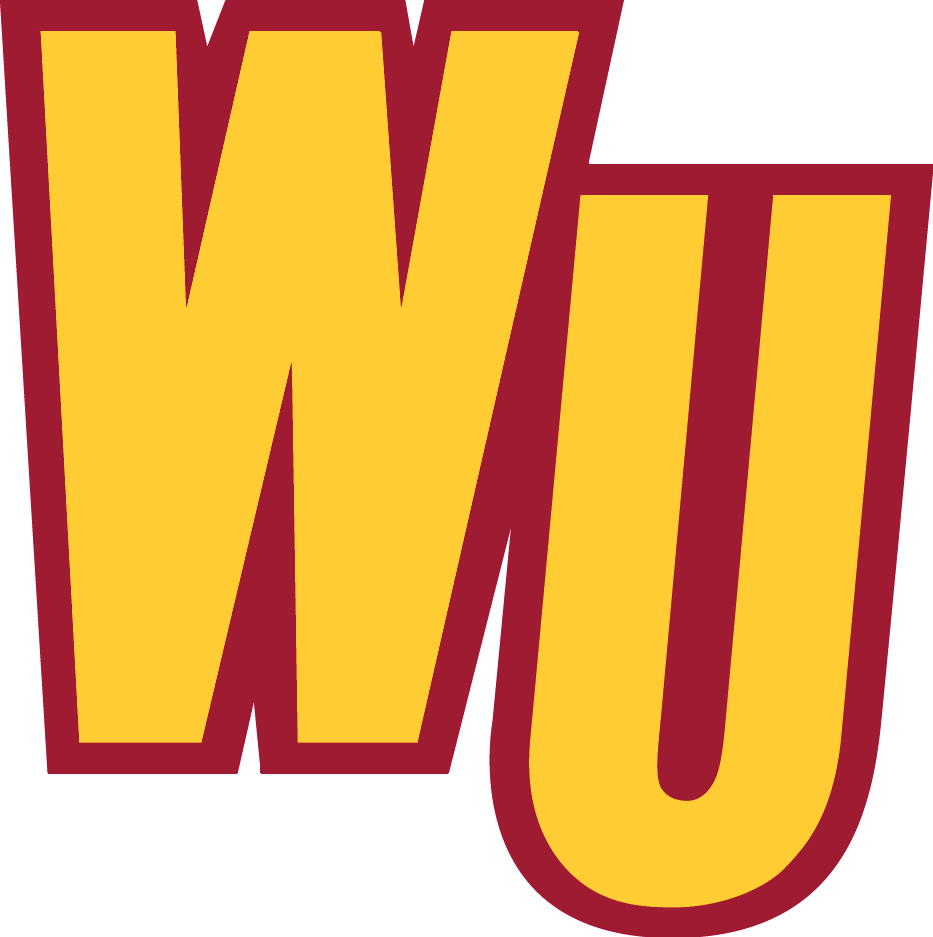

Big South regular season co-champions Big South tournament champions

NCAA tournament, first round
- Conference: Big South Conference
- Record: 19–12 (10–4 Big South)
- Head coach: Gregg Marshall (4th season)
- Assistant coach: Barclay Radebaugh (1st season)
- Home arena: Winthrop Coliseum

2001–02 Big South Conference men's basketball standings
	Conf.				Overall
Team	W		L	PCT	W		L	PCT
Winthrop †	10	–	4	.714	19	–	12	.613
UNC Asheville	10	–	4	.714	13	–	15	.464
Radford	9	–	5	.643	15	–	16	.484
Charleston Southern	8	–	6	.571	12	–	17	.414
Elon	7	–	7	.500	13	–	16	.448
Coastal Carolina	5	–	9	.357	8	–	20	.286
High Point	5	–	9	.357	11	–	19	.367
Liberty	2	–	12	.143	5	–	25	.167
† 2002 Big South tournament winner Rankings from AP Poll

The 2001–02 Winthrop Eagles men's basketball team represented Winthrop University during the 2001–02 college basketball season. This was head coach Gregg Marshall's fourth season at Winthrop. The Eagles competed in the Big South Conference and played their home games at Winthrop Coliseum. They finished the season 19–12, 10–4 in Big South play to finish tied atop the conference regular season standings. They won the 2002 Big South Conference men's basketball tournament to receive the conference's automatic bid to the 2002 NCAA Division I men's basketball tournament. Playing as the No. 16 seed in the South region, the Eagles lost to No. 1 overall seed and defending National champion Duke in the opening round

== Roster ==
2001–02 Winthrop Eagles men's basketball team
Players	Coaches
Pos. / # / Name / Height / Weight / Year / Previous school / Hometown; F / 30 / Greg Lewis / 6 ft 6 in (1.98 m) / 215 lb (98 kg) / Sr / Howard College / Akron, Ohio	Head coach: Gregg Marshall; Assistant coach(es): Barclay Radebaugh (East Tennessee State); Legend: (C) Team captain; (S) Suspended; (I) Ineligible; (W) Walk-on; Injured; Current redshirt; Roster

== Schedule and results ==
Date time, TV	Rank^{#}	Opponent^{#}	Result	Record	Site (attendance) city, state
Non-conference regular season
Nov 16, 2001*; 9:00 p.m.		Lander	W 60–58	1–0	Winthrop Coliseum (1,493); Rock Hill, South Carolina
Nov 18, 2001*; 5:00 p.m.		at Ohio State	L 54–78	1–1	Value City Arena (13,957); Columbus, Ohio
Nov 24, 2001*; 8:00 p.m.		at Nebraska	L 65–73	1–2	Bob Devaney Sports Center (5,426); Lincoln, Nebraska
Nov 27, 2001*; 7:00 p.m.		Birmingham–Southern	W 67–53	2–2	Winthrop Coliseum (966); Rock Hill, South Carolina
Nov 29, 2001*; 6:30 p.m.		vs. Niagara; Phoenix Classic	L 58–63	2–3	XL Center (3,669); Hartford, Connecticut
Nov 30, 2001*		at Hartford; Phoenix Classic	L 55–58	2–4	XL Center (6,919); Hartford, Connecticut
Dec 3, 2001*; 8:00 p.m.		Marshall	L 65–71	2–5	Winthrop Coliseum (1,364); Rock Hill, South Carolina
Dec 18, 2001*; 7:00 p.m.		at Clemson	W 66–61	3–5	Littlejohn Coliseum (7,600); Clemson, South Carolina
Dec 21, 2001*; 8:00 p.m.		Tennessee–Martin; Costner Brothers Winthrop Shootout	W 86–60	4–5	Winthrop Coliseum (934); Rock Hill, South Carolina
Dec 22, 2001*		South Carolina State	L 58–71	4–6	Winthrop Coliseum (1,013); Rock Hill, South Carolina
Dec 28, 2001*; 6:00 p.m.		vs. George Mason; Rogers AT&T NCAA Classic	L 66–86	4–7	Halifax Metro Centre (5,486); Halifax, Nova Scotia
Big South Regular Season
Jan 9, 2002; 7:00 p.m.		at Radford	L 48–69	4–8 (0–1)	Dedmon Center (2,758); Radford, Virginia
Jan 12, 2002; 7:00 p.m.		Elon	W 76–64	5–8 (1–1)	Winthrop Coliseum (1,370); Rock Hill, South Carolina
Jan 15, 2002*; 7:00 p.m.		Randolph–Macon	W 75–69	6–8	Winthrop Coliseum (832); Rock Hill, South Carolina
Jan 19, 2002; 7:30 p.m.		at Liberty	W 81–48	7–8 (2–1)	Vines Center (1,633); Lynchburg, Virginia
Jan 21, 2002; 8:30 p.m.		at High Point	W 83–75	8–8 (3–1)	Millis Athletic Convocation Center (1,039); High Point, North Carolina
Jan 24, 2002; 8:00 p.m.		Charleston Southern	L 63–66 ^{OT}	8–9 (3–2)	Winthrop Coliseum (1,233); Rock Hill, South Carolina
Jan 26, 2002; 4:30 p.m.		at UNC Asheville	W 73–66	9–9 (4–2)	Justice Center (1,075); Asheville, North Carolina
Jan 29, 2002; 7:00 p.m.		High Point	W 81–71	10–9 (5–2)	Winthrop Coliseum (779); Rock Hill, South Carolina
Jan 31, 2002; 7:00 p.m.		at Coastal Carolina	W 68–49	11–9 (6–2)	Kimbel Arena (837); Conway, South Carolina
Feb 4, 2002; 7:00 p.m.		at Elon	L 64–71	11–10 (6–3)	Alumni Gym (1,301); Elon, North Carolina
Feb 7, 2002; 8:00 p.m.		at Birmingham–Southern	W 63–56	12–10	Bill Battle Coliseum (1,018); Birmingham, Alabama
Feb 9, 2002; 7:00 p.m.		Radford	L 64–72	12–11 (6–4)	Winthrop Coliseum (1,636); Rock Hill, South Carolina
Feb 14, 2002; 7:00 p.m.		Liberty	W 69–62	13–11 (7–4)	Winthrop Coliseum (871); Rock Hill, South Carolina
Feb 16, 2002; 4:00 p.m.		at Charleston Southern	W 57–55	14–11 (8–4)	Buccaneer Field House (429); North Charleston, South Carolina
Feb 18, 2002; 7:00 p.m.		Coastal Carolina	W 100–74	15–11 (9–4)	Winthrop Coliseum (1,021); Rock Hill, South Carolina
Feb 23, 2002; 7:00 p.m.		UNC Asheville	W 77–62	16–11 (10–4)	Winthrop Coliseum (4,054); Rock Hill, South Carolina
Big South tournament
Feb 28, 2002*	(1)	vs. (8) Liberty; Quarterfinals	W 66–59	17–11	Roanoke Civic Center (841); Roanoke, Virginia
Mar 1, 2002*	(1)	vs. (5) Elon; Semifinals	W 77–66	18–11	Roanoke Civic Center (2,016); Roanoke, Virginia
Mar 2, 2002*	(1)	vs. (7) High Point; Finals	W 70–48	19–11	Roanoke Civic Center (1,292); Roanoke, Virginia
NCAA tournament
Mar 14, 2002*	(16 S)	vs. (1 S) No. 1 Duke; First round	L 37–84	19–12	BI-LO Center (14,198); Greenville, South Carolina
*Non-conference game. ^{#}Rankings from AP poll. (#) Tournament seedings in parentheses. S=South. All times are in Eastern.
