= 1995–96 UNC Greensboro Spartans men's basketball team =

American college basketball season

1995–96 UNC Greensboro Spartans men's basketball

SoCon tournament champions

NCAA tournament
- Conference: Big South Conference
- Record: 20–10 (11–3 Big South)
- Head coach: Randy Peele (1st season)
- Home arena: Greensboro Coliseum

1995–96 Big South Conference men's basketball standings
	Conf.				Overall
Team	W		L	PCT	W		L	PCT
UNC Greensboro †	11	–	3	.786	20	–	10	.667
Liberty	9	–	5	.643	17	–	12	.586
UNC Asheville	9	–	5	.643	18	–	10	.643
Charleston Southern	9	–	5	.643	15	–	13	.536
Radford	8	–	6	.571	14	–	13	.519
Winthrop	6	–	8	.429	7	–	19	.269
UMBC	3	–	11	.214	5	–	22	.185
Coastal Carolina	1	–	13	.071	5	–	21	.192
† 1996 Big South tournament winner Rankings from AP Poll

The 1995–96 UNC Greensboro Spartans men's basketball team represented the University of North Carolina at Greensboro during the 1995–96 NCAA Division I men's basketball season. The Spartans were led by first-year head coach, Randy Peele and played its home games at Greensboro Coliseum as members of the Big South Conference. They finished the season 19–12, 10–6 in SoCon play to finished second in the North Division. They won the Southern Conference tournament to earn the conference's automatic bid to the NCAA tournament – the first appearance in school history. Playing as the No. 15 seed in the Southeast region, the Spartans were beaten by No. 2 seed Cincinnati, 66–61.

== Roster ==
1995–96 UNC Greensboro Spartans men's basketball team
Players	Coaches
Pos. / # / Name / Height / Weight / Year / Hometown; F / 32 / Brian Brunson / 6 ft 8 in (2.03 m) / — / Sr	Head coach: Randy Peele; Assistant coach(es) Legend: (C) Team captain; (S) Suspended; (I) Ineligible; (W) Walk-on; Injured; Current redshirt

== Schedule and results ==
Date time, TV	Rank^{#}	Opponent^{#}	Result	Record	Site (attendance) city, state
Regular Season
Nov 24, 1995*		at South Carolina	L 64–82	0–1	Carolina Coliseum; Columbia, South Carolina
Nov 29, 1995*		at No. 12 Duke	L 57–71	0–2	Cameron Indoor Stadium (9,314); Durham, North Carolina
Big South Conference tournament
Feb 29, 1996*		vs. Coastal Carolina; Quarterfinals	W 78–67	18–9	Vines Center; Lynchburg, Virginia
Mar 1, 1996*		vs. Charleston Southern; Semifinals	W 69–60	19–9	Vines Center; Lynchburg, Virginia
Mar 2, 1996*		at Liberty; Championship game	W 79–53	20–9	Vines Center; Lynchburg, Virginia
NCAA tournament
Mar 15, 1996*	(15 SE)	vs. (2 SE) No. 7 Cincinnati; First round	L 61–66	20–10	Orlando Arena; Orlando, Florida
*Non-conference game. ^{#}Rankings from AP Poll. (#) Tournament seedings in parentheses. S=Southeast. All times are in Eastern Time.
