= 1998–99 Winthrop Eagles men's basketball team =

American college basketball season

1998–99 Winthrop Eagles men's basketball
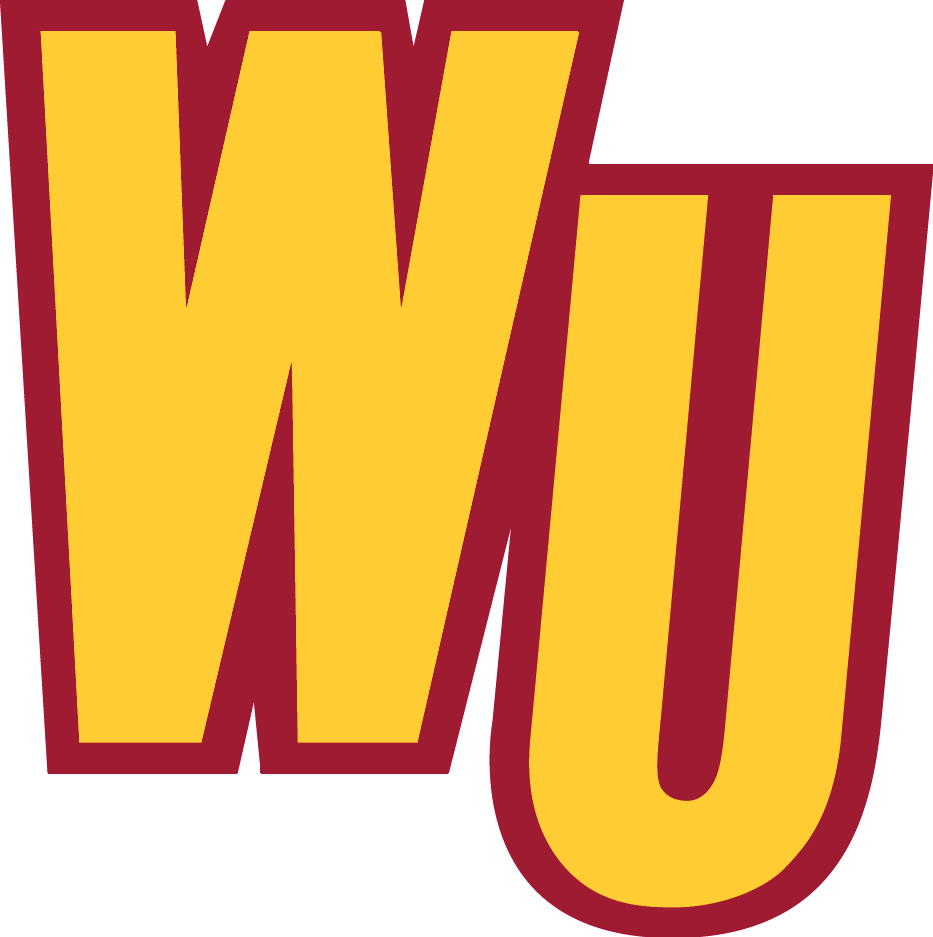

Big South regular season and tournament champions

NCAA tournament, first round
- Conference: Big South Conference
- Record: 21–8 (9–1 Big South)
- Head coach: Gregg Marshall (1st season)
- Home arena: Winthrop Coliseum

1998–99 Big South Conference men's basketball standings
	Conf.				Overall
Team	W		L	PCT	W		L	PCT
Winthrop †	9	–	1	.900	21	–	8	.724
Radford	8	–	2	.800	20	–	8	.714
UNC Asheville	5	–	5	.500	11	–	18	.379
Charleston Southern	4	–	6	.400	12	–	16	.429
Coastal Carolina	4	–	6	.400	7	–	20	.259
Liberty	0	–	10	.000	4	–	23	.148
† 1999 Big South tournament winner Rankings from AP Poll

The 1998–99 Winthrop Eagles men's basketball team represented Winthrop University during the 1998–99 college basketball season. This was head coach Gregg Marshall's first season at Winthrop. The Eagles competed in the Big South Conference and played their home games at Winthrop Coliseum. They finished the season 21–8, 9–1 in Big South play to finish first in the conference regular season standings. They won the 1999 Big South Conference men's basketball tournament to receive the conference's automatic bid to the 1999 NCAA Division I men's basketball tournament – the first appearance in program history. Playing as No. 16 seed in the South region, the Eagles lost to No. 1 seed Auburn in the opening round.

== Roster ==
1998–99 Winthrop Eagles men's basketball team
Players	Coaches
Pos. / # / Name / Height / Weight / Year / Previous school / Hometown; G / / Tyson Waterman / 6 ft 0 in (1.83 m) / — / Jr	Head coach: Gregg Marshall; Assistant coach(es) Legend: (C) Team captain; (S) Suspended; (I) Ineligible; (W) Walk-on; Injured; Current redshirt; Roster

== Schedule and results ==
- All times are Eastern

Date time, TV	Rank^{#}	Opponent^{#}	Result	Record	Site (attendance) city, state
Non-conference regular season
Nov 14, 1998*		Virginia–Wise	W 71–50	1–0	Winthrop Coliseum; Rock Hill, South Carolina
Nov 16, 1998*		Mercer	W 79–63	2–0	Winthrop Coliseum; Rock Hill, South Carolina
Nov 23, 1998*		Furman	W 60–59	3–0	Winthrop Coliseum; Rock Hill, South Carolina
Nov 28, 1998*		at Minnesota	L 59–68	3–1	Williams Arena; Minneapolis, Minnesota
Dec 2, 1998*		at Central Florida	L 57–79	3–2	UCF Arena; Orlando, Florida
Dec 5, 1998*		Campbell	W 64–58	4–2	Winthrop Coliseum; Rock Hill, South Carolina
Dec 8, 1998*		at The Citadel	W 64–49	5–2	McAlister Field House; Charleston, South Carolina
Dec 17, 1998*		at NC State	L 51–81	5–3	Reynolds Coliseum; Raleigh, North Carolina
Dec 20, 1998*		at Appalachian State	L 53–74	5–4	Varsity Gymnasium; Boone, North Carolina
Dec 30, 1998*		at Virginia Tech	L 55–62	5–5	Cassell Coliseum; Blacksburg, Virginia
Big South Regular Season
Jan 9, 1999		Radford	W 70–56	1–0	Winthrop Coliseum; Rock Hill, South Carolina
Feb 20, 1999		UNC Asheville	W 61–57	9–1	Winthrop Coliseum; Rock Hill, South Carolina
Big South tournament
Feb 26, 1999*		vs. Charleston Southern; Semifinals	W 70–61	20–7	Asheville Civic Center; Asheville, North Carolina
Feb 27, 1999*		vs. Radford; Championship game	W 86–74	21–7	Asheville Civic Center; Asheville, North Carolina
NCAA tournament
Mar 11, 1999*	(16 S)	vs. (1 S) No. 4 Auburn; First round	L 41–80	21–8	RCA Dome; Indianapolis, Indiana
*Non-conference game. ^{#}Rankings from AP poll. (#) Tournament seedings in parentheses. S=South. All times are in Eastern.
