= Randy Peele =

American men's college basketball coach (born 1957)

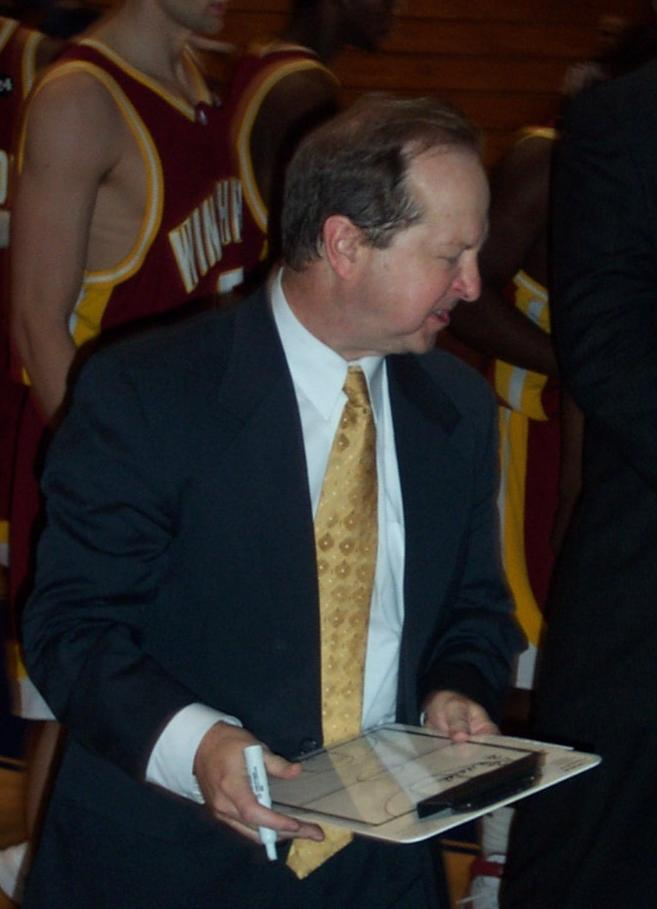
- Peele as head coach of the Winthrop Eagles in 2007

Biographical details
- Born: June 12, 1957 (age 69); Norfolk, Virginia, U.S.
- Education: Virginia Wesleyan (1980)

Coaching career (HC unless noted)
- 1983–1985: Saint Michael's (assistant)
- 1985–1988: UT Martin (assistant)
- 1988–1991: Campbell (assistant)
- 1991–1995: UNC Greensboro (assistant)
- 1995–1999: UNC Greensboro
- 1999–2002: Virginia Tech (assistant)
- 2003–2007: Winthrop (assistant)
- 2007–2012: Winthrop
- 2013–2014: Georgia Southern (assistant)
- 2014–2018: Tennessee State (associate HC)
- 2018–2022: Texas Southern (assistant)

Head coaching record
- Tournaments: 0–2 (NCAA Division I)

Accomplishments and honors

Championships
- Big South regular season (1996); 3 Big South tournament (1996, 2008, 2010)

Randy Peele (born June 12, 1957) is an American college basketball coach. Peele served as the head men's basketball coach at the University of North Carolina at Greensboro from 1995 to 1999 and Winthrop University to 2007 to 2012.

== Biography ==
Peele graduated from Virginia Wesleyan College in 1980 with a degree in secondary education. In 1983, he began his coaching career when he accepted an assistant's job at Saint Michael's College in Vermont. After two years in Vermont, Peele spent three years as an assistant at the University of Tennessee at Martin and another three years at the Campbell University.

In 1991, Peele accepted an assistant's job at the University of North Carolina at Greensboro. After four years with the Spartans, Peele was promoted to replace former head coach Mike Dement, who had left to take over the men's basketball program at Southern Methodist University (SMU).

In Peele's first season, only the second year in which UNC Greensboro was eligible for NCAA Division I postseason competition, the Spartans won the Big South Conference regular season and tournament championships. In the NCAA tournament, UNC Greensboro was the 15th seed in the Southeast region, falling in the first round to the Cincinnati Bearcats.

After 1996, however, Peele had little success with the Spartans. UNC Greensboro followed up their Big South championship with a 10–20 regular season, and then left the Big South in 1997 to join the Southern Conference. The Spartans finished at or near the bottom of their division in both of their first two seasons in the SoCon, and after four years in Greensboro, Peele left the Spartans and took an assistant's job with the Virginia Tech Hokies.

Peele spent three seasons under Ricky Stokes in Blacksburg before leaving and spending a season away from coaching. In 2003, he resurfaced in the coaching world, this time as an assistant to Gregg Marshall at Winthrop University. In four seasons at Winthrop, the Eagles won three straight Big South titles, culminating in 2007 with a first-round upset of the Notre Dame Fighting Irish in the NCAA tournament.

Following the 2007 season, Marshall left Winthrop to take the vacant head coaching position at Wichita State University. Winthrop's administration wasted little time, and quickly promoted Peele to take over for Marshall.

Peele continued Marshall's tradition of success, winning the 2008 and 2010 Big South Conference Tournaments.

However, after a 12–20 season in 2012, Randy Peele was relieved of his coaching duties at Winthrop on March 5.

Peele joined head coach Mark Byington at Georgia Southern University for the 2013–14 season before leaving to be the associate head coach at Tennessee State University beginning in the 2014–15 season.

Peele served as the special assistant to the head coach under Johnny Jones with the Texas Southern Tigers from 2018 to 2022.

== Head coaching record ==
Record table
Season	Team	Overall	Conference	Standing	Postseason
UNC Greensboro Spartans (Big South Conference) (1995–1997)
1995–96	UNC Greensboro	20–10	11–3	1st	NCAA Division I first round
1996–97	UNC Greensboro	10–20	6–8	T–5th	
UNC Greensboro Spartans (Southern Conference) (1997–1999)
1997–98	UNC Greensboro	9–19	6–9	T–4th (North)	
1998–99	UNC Greensboro	7–20	5–11	5th (North)	
UNC Greensboro:		46–69	28–31		
Winthrop Eagles (Big South Conference) (2007–2012)
2007–08	Winthrop	22–12	10–4	T–1st	NCAA Division I first round
2008–09	Winthrop	11–19	9–9	T–5th	
2009–10	Winthrop	19–14	12–6	3rd	NCAA Division I Opening Round
2010–11	Winthrop	13–17	9–9	T–5th	
2011–12	Winthrop	12–20	8–10	T–6th	
Winthrop:		77–81	48–38		
Total:		123-150			
National champion Postseason invitational champion Conference regular season champion Conference regular season and conference tournament champion Division regular season champion Division regular season and conference tournament champion Conference tournament champion
