= 2007–08 Winthrop Eagles men's basketball team =

American college basketball season

2007–08 Winthrop Eagles men's basketball
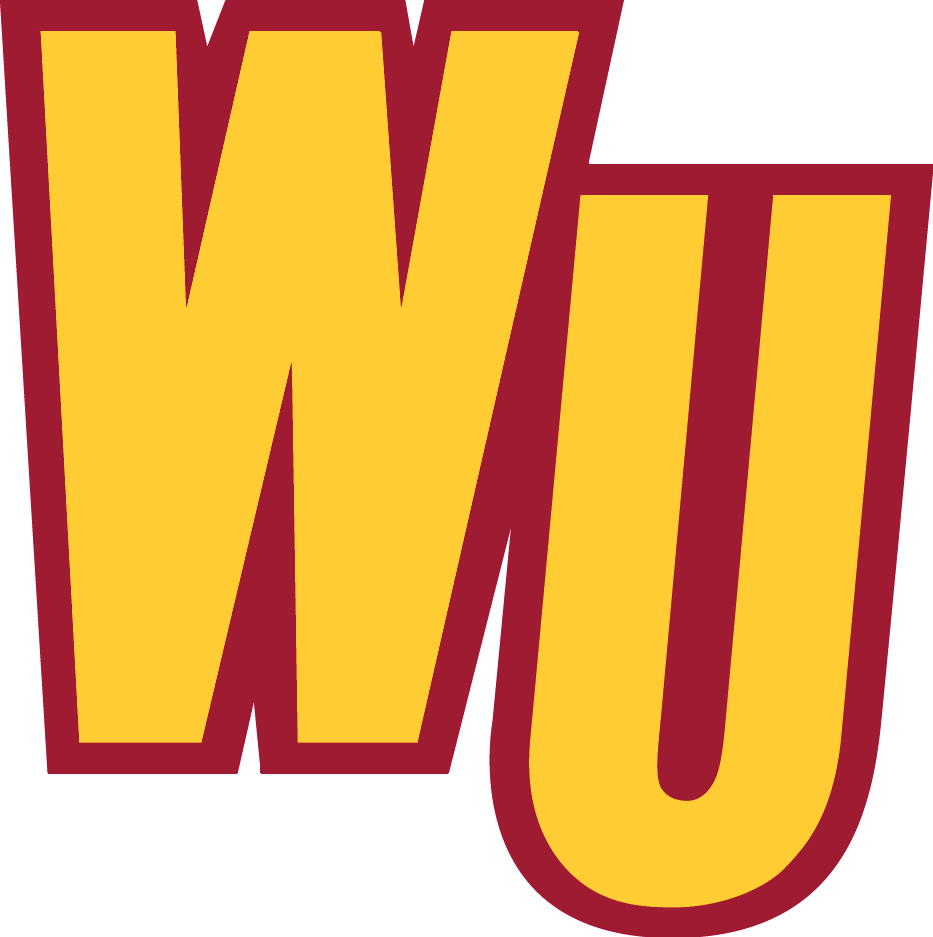

Big South tournament champions

NCAA tournament, first round
- Conference: Big South Conference
- Record: 22–12 (10–4 Big South)
- Head coach: Randy Peele (1st season)
- Assistant coaches: Paul Molinari; Larry Dixon; Marty McGillan
- Home arena: Winthrop Coliseum

2007–08 Big South men's basketball standings
	Conf.				Overall
Team	W		L	PCT	W		L	PCT
UNC Asheville	10	–	4	.714	23	–	10	.697
Winthrop †	10	–	4	.714	22	–	12	.647
High Point	8	–	6	.571	17	–	14	.548
Liberty	7	–	7	.500	16	–	16	.500
VMI	6	–	8	.429	14	–	15	.483
Coastal Carolina	6	–	8	.429	13	–	15	.464
Radford	5	–	9	.357	10	–	20	.333
Charleston Southern	4	–	10	.286	10	–	20	.333
† 2008 Big South tournament winner As of March 8, 2008; Rankings from AP Poll

The 2007–08 Winthrop Eagles men's basketball team represented Winthrop University during the 2007–08 college basketball season. This was head coach Randy Peele's first season at Winthrop. The Eagles competed in the Big South Conference and played their home games at Winthrop Coliseum.

They finished the season 22–12, 10–4 in Big South play to finish tied for first atop the conference standings. They won the 2008 Big South Conference men's basketball tournament to receive the conference's automatic bid to the 2008 NCAA Division I men's basketball tournament as No. 13 seed in the East region. They were defeated in the first round by No. 4 seed Washington State.

== Roster ==
2007–08 Winthrop Eagles men's basketball team
Players
Coaches

Pos.	#	Name	Height	Weight	Year	Previous school	Hometown
G	3	Justin Burton	5 ft 10 in (1.78 m)	158 lb (72 kg)	RS Fr		Durham, North Carolina
G	10	Chris Gaynor	5 ft 10 in (1.78 m)	161 lb (73 kg)	Sr	Mount Tabor	Winston-Salem, North Carolina
G	11	Michael Jenkins	6 ft 3 in (1.91 m)	195 lb (88 kg)	Sr	Kinston	Kinston, North Carolina
G	13	Marc-David Vil	6 ft 4 in (1.93 m)	191 lb (87 kg)	Fr		Montreal, Quebec
C	15	Andy Buechert	6 ft 9 in (2.06 m)	230 lb (104 kg)	Jr	Tallahassee CC	Trier, Germany
G	21	Antwon Harris	6 ft 3 in (1.91 m)	206 lb (93 kg)	Sr	Highland CC	Clarksville, Tennessee
G	25	Byron Faison	6 ft 1 in (1.85 m)	198 lb (90 kg)	RS Fr		Sumter, South Carolina
F	30	Chris Malcolm	6 ft 7 in (2.01 m)	205 lb (93 kg)	Fr		Orlando, Florida
F	31	Taj McCullough	6 ft 7 in (2.01 m)	222 lb (101 kg)	Sr	Carver	Atlanta, Georgia
F	33	Mantoris Robinson	6 ft 5 in (1.96 m)	205 lb (93 kg)	RS So		Charlotte, North Carolina
F	42	Charles Corbin	6 ft 7 in (2.01 m)	228 lb (103 kg)	Fr		Griffin, Georgia
F	43	George Valentine	6 ft 8 in (2.03 m)	228 lb (103 kg)	Fr		Fayetteville, North Carolina
F	44	Jonathan Rice	6 ft 5 in (1.96 m)	231 lb (105 kg)	Jr		Columbia, South Carolina

Head coach

- Randy Peele

Assistant coach(es)

Legend

- (C) Team captain
- (S) Suspended
- (I) Ineligible
- (W) Walk-on
- Injured
- Current redshirt

Roster

== Schedule and results ==
- All times are Eastern

Date time, TV	Rank^{#}	Opponent^{#}	Result	Record	Site (attendance) city, state
Non-conference regular season
Nov 10, 2007*		Queens (NC)	W 68–61	1–0	Winthrop Coliseum (3,311); Rock Hill, South Carolina
Nov 16, 2007*		vs. Illinois-Chicago; Paradise Jam tournament	W 72–58	2–0	Sports and Fitness Center (2,100); Saint Thomas, U.S. Virgin Islands
Nov 18, 2007*		vs. Georgia Tech; Paradise Jam Tournament	W 79–73	3–0	Sports and Fitness Center (3,100); Saint Thomas, U.S. Virgin Islands
Nov 19, 2007*		vs. Baylor; Paradise Jam Tournament	L 54–62	3–1	Sports and Fitness Center (3,325); Saint Thomas, U.S. Virgin Islands
Nov 25, 2007*		Missouri State	L 69–73	3–2	Winthrop Coliseum (2,754); Rock Hill, South Carolina
Nov 28, 2007*		at East Carolina	W 72–57	4–2	Minges Coliseum (4,028); Greenville, North Carolina
Dec 1, 2007*		at West Virginia	L 53–70	4–3	WVU Coliseum (8,559); Morgantown, West Virginia
Dec 4, 2007*		Akron	W 68–58	5–3	Winthrop Coliseum (2,654); Rock Hill, South Carolina
Dec 13, 2007*		vs. Ole Miss	L 71–76	5–4	Mississippi Coliseum (4,413)
Dec 18, 2007*		at Mount St. Mary's	L 59–64	5–5	Knott Arena (702); Emmitsburg, Maryland
Dec 21, 2007*		Old Dominion	W 62–59	6–5	Winthrop Coliseum (3,054); Rock Hill, South Carolina
Dec 29, 2007*		vs. No. 19 Miami (FL); Orange Bowl Basketball Classic	W 76–70	7–5	Bank Atlantic Center (13,100); Sunrise, Florida
Jan 2, 2008*		Limestone	W 78–34	8–5	Winthrop Coliseum (2,275); Rock Hill, South Carolina
Jan 5, 2008*		at Marshall	L 62–67 ^{OT}	8–6	Cam Henderson Center (4,704); Huntington, West Virginia
Jan 9, 2008*		Presbyterian	W 55–48	9–6	Winthrop Coliseum (2,619); Rock Hill, South Carolina
Big South Regular Season
Jan 12, 2008		at High Point	L 61–62	9–7 (0–1)	Millis Center (2,117); High Point, North Carolina
Jan 15, 2008		Liberty	W 55–48	10–7 (1–1)	Winthrop Coliseum (3,139); Rock Hill, South Carolina
Jan 19, 2008		at Radford	W 77–59	11–7 (2–1)	Donald N. Dedmon Center (2,253); Radford, Virginia
Jan 23, 2008		VMI	W 85–41	12–7 (3–1)	Winthrop Coliseum (3,027); Rock Hill, South Carolina
Jan 26, 2008		Coastal Carolina	W 65–43	13–7 (4–1)	Winthrop Coliseum (5,865); Rock Hill, South Carolina
Jan 28, 2008		at Charleston Southern	W 81–64	14–7 (5–1)	Buccaneer Field House (856); North Charleston, South Carolina
Feb 2, 2008		at UNC Asheville	L 56–71	14–8 (5–2)	Charlie Justice Center (1,198); Asheville, North Carolina
Feb 6, 2008		at Coastal Carolina	L 49–50	14–9 (5–3)	Kimbel Arena (1,162); Conway, South Carolina
Feb 9, 2008		High Point	W 62–54	15–9 (6–3)	Winthrop Coliseum (4,236); Rock Hill, South Carolina
Feb 12, 2008		at Liberty	W 59–50	16–9 (7–3)	Vines Center (2,186); Lynchburg, Virginia
Feb 16, 2008*		Radford	W 74–59	17–9 (8–3)	Winthrop Coliseum (3,627); Rock Hill, South Carolina
Feb 20, 2008		at VMI	W 80–70	18–9 (9–3)	Cameron Hall (2,236); Lexington, Virginia
Feb 22, 2008*		Davidson; Bracket buster	L 47–60	18–10	Winthrop Coliseum (6,105); Rock Hill, South Carolina
Feb 26, 2008		Charleston Southern	W 63–49	19–10 (10–3)	Winthrop Coliseum (2,729); Rock Hill, South Carolina
Mar 1, 2008		UNC Asheville	L 50–63	19–11 (10–4)	Winthrop Coliseum (6,043); Rock Hill, South Carolina
Big South tournament
Mar 4, 2008*		Radford; Quarterfinals	W 76–45	20–11	Winthrop Coliseum (1,888); Rock Hill, South Carolina
Mar 6, 2008*		vs. High Point; Semifinals	W 61–53	21–11	Charlie Justice Center (987); Asheville, North Carolina
Mar 8, 2008*		at UNC Asheville; Championship Game	W 66–48	22–11	Charlie Justice Center (1,207); Asheville, North Carolina
NCAA tournament
Mar 20, 2008*	(13 E)	vs. (4 E) No. 21 Washington State; First Round	L 40–71	22–12	The Pepsi Center (19,280); Denver, Colorado
*Non-conference game. ^{#}Rankings from AP poll. (#) Tournament seedings in parentheses. E=East. All times are in Eastern.
