= Gregg Marshall =

American college basketball coach

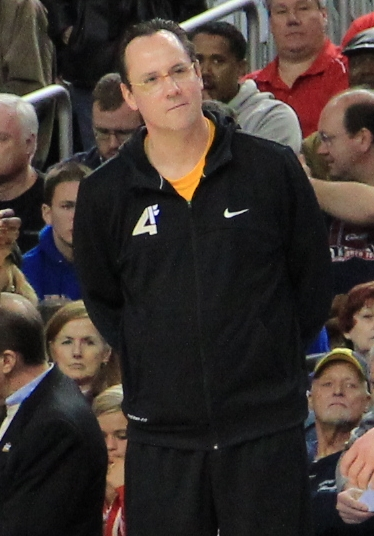
- Marshall on the sideline before Wichita State's 2013 Final Four Appearance against Louisville

Biographical details
- Born: February 27, 1963 (age 63); Greenwood, South Carolina, U.S.

Playing career
- 1981–1985: Randolph–Macon
- Position: Guard

Coaching career (HC unless noted)
- 1985–1987: Randolph–Macon (assistant)
- 1987–1988: Belmont Abbey (assistant)
- 1988–1996: Charleston (assistant)
- 1996–1998: Marshall (assistant)
- 1998–2007: Winthrop
- 2007–2020: Wichita State

Head coaching record
- Overall: 525–204
- Tournaments: 11–14 (NCAA Division I); 8–1 (NIT); 1–1 (CBI)

Accomplishments and honors

Championships
- NCAA Regional —Final Four (2013); NIT (2011); 7 Big South tournament (1999, 2000–2002, 2005–2007); 6 Big South regular season (1999, 2002, 2003, 2005–2007); 5 MVC regular season (2012, 2014–2017); 2 MVC tournament (2014, 2017)

Awards
- Hugh Durham Award (2007); Adolph Rupp Cup (2014); AP Coach of the Year (2014); Henry Iba Award (2014); NABC Coach of the Year (2014); Naismith National Coach of the Year (2014); 4× Big South Coach of the Year (1999, 2003, 2005, 2007); 3× MVC Coach of the Year (2012–2014)

Michael Gregg Marshall (born February 27, 1963) is an American college basketball coach who served as the head basketball coach at Winthrop University and Wichita State University. Marshall has coached his teams to appearances in the NCAA Division I men's basketball tournament in 14 of 22 years as a head coach. He is the winningest head coach in Wichita State and Winthrop history with 331 and 194 wins, respectively. He resigned on November 17, 2020, after an internal investigation following allegations by multiple former players detailing physical and verbal abuse at the hands of Marshall. Marshall was paid a settlement of $7,750,000 by Wichita State for his resignation.

== Early life and education ==
Marshall was born in Greenwood, South Carolina. He went to Cave Spring High School in Roanoke, Virginia, where he graduated in 1981 and was a 6'2", 145-pound point guard on the Knights' basketball team. He graduated from Randolph–Macon College with a Bachelor of Arts degree in economics and business in 1985. At Randolph-Macon, he became a brother of the Sigma Alpha Epsilon fraternity. He later received his master's degree in sport management from the University of Richmond in 1987. He is married to Lynn Munday of Bellingham, Washington.

== Coaching career ==
=== Assistant ===
Marshall spent two years (1985–1987) as an assistant at his alma mater, Randolph-Macon College, in Ashland, Virginia, and another year as an assistant at Belmont Abbey College during the 1987–88 season. He then spent eight years under John Kresse at the College of Charleston from 1988 to 1996, where the program received an at-large 1994 NCAA bid, and NIT invitations in 1995 and 1996. He became an assistant coach at Marshall University, serving from 1996 to 1998.

=== Winthrop ===
Marshall became the head coach at Winthrop University in 1998, and led the Winthrop Eagles men's basketball team to seven NCAA tournament appearances and transformed a previously undistinguished program into a mid-major powerhouse. In his first season at Winthrop in 1998–99, he compiled a record of 19–8 (9–1 in Big South Conference play), coaching the Eagles to their first regular season Big South title. They went on to win the Big South Conference tournament, earning the Eagles their first-ever bid to the NCAA tournament. As a No. 16 seed, the team lost to the No. 1 seed Auburn Tigers in the first round, 80–41.

During his nine seasons at Winthrop, Marshall coached the team to six regular season titles (1999, 2002, 2003, 2005, 2006, 2007), seven Big South tournament titles (1999, 2000, 2001, 2002, 2005, 2006, 2007), six 20-win seasons (1999, 2000, 2003, 2005, 2006, 2007), and was named Big South Coach of the Year four times (1999, 2003, 2005, 2007). In 2006, he became the all-time most successful coach in Winthrop men's basketball history. During the 2006–07 season, Marshall became the first coach in the history of the Big South Conference to have his team go undefeated in conference play.

The 2006 NCAA Tournament matched No. 15 seed Winthrop against the No. 2 seed Tennessee Volunteers, the Southeastern Conference Eastern Division champion, in the first round. Winthrop led for much of the game, only to lose 63–61 on a long jump shot with 2.9 seconds remaining. In 2007, Marshall became the first Big South coach to win an NCAA first round tournament game by defeating No. 6 seed Notre Dame.

Marshall's success at the mid-major level created a lot of speculation that he could be a contender for the coaching position at North Carolina State University, which was vacated with the departure of Herb Sendek. Sidney Lowe, a former NC State player and former head coach of the NBA's Minnesota Timberwolves and Memphis Grizzlies, was eventually named the head coach of the Wolfpack. Marshall accepted an offer to coach the College of Charleston in June 2006 but changed his mind after the press conference introducing him as coach and returned to Winthrop.

=== Wichita State ===
Marshall was named head coach at Wichita State University on April 14, 2007 In his fourth season at WSU, Marshall led the Shockers to the NIT Championship, defeating Alabama in the finals. Under Marshall, Wichita State broke into the AP Top 25 poll on February 13, 2012, the first time since December 25, 2006, and only the second time since 1983. In 2012, Wichita State made its first appearance in the NCAA tournament since the 2005–06 season, receiving an at-large bid. The Shockers were matched as a No. 5 seed versus the No. 12 seed VCU Rams, but the Shockers lost 59–62. In the 2012–13 season, Marshall led the Shockers to their first Final Four since 1965, defeating the AP #1, #7, and #20 teams in the country to win the West Regional.

In 2013–14, Marshall led Wichita State to arguably the greatest season in school history. The Shockers steamrolled through the regular season, becoming the second Division I team to start a regular season with 30 consecutive wins (31–0). They rose as high as second in both major polls in late February, the highest that a Shocker team has been ranked since 1981. On March 9, 2014, Wichita State finished their regular season and the Missouri Valley Conference tournament with a record of 34–0, heading into the NCAA Tournament undefeated. That record ties an NCAA Division I Men's basketball record, held by the UNLV, set in 1991. Wichita State later went on to win their first game of the 2014 NCAA tournament versus Cal Poly 64–37. The Shockers were 35–0, becoming the first team in men's Division I basketball history to start with 35 wins and zero losses. In the third round of the tournament they squared off against Kentucky. Wichita State lost the game 76–78, ending their perfect run. They finished the 2013–14 season at 35–1.

In October 2020, The Athletic reported that Marshall was under investigation by Wichita State for misconduct after 6 basketball players applied to transfer the previous season.

On November 17, 2020, Marshall resigned from Wichita State. He will be paid a settlement of $7.75 million over six years. Lead assistant Isaac Brown was named head coach.

== Abuse investigation and resignation ==
On November 17, 2020, Marshall resigned as coach of Wichita State after multiple allegations of verbal and physical abuse spanning years.

Wichita State announced an internal investigation on October 9 after several abuse allegations from both staff and players went public in reports on October 8 by The Athletic and Stadium. The allegations, some of which were corroborated by several players, included punching player Shaquille Morris during an October 2015 practice, as well as choking assistant Kyle Lindsted during the 2016–17 season. Other allegations detailed in The Athletic include Marshall telling a Native American player to "get back on his horse" and making "Indian howling noises" during the 2018–19 season.

In an October 13 statement to the Wichita Eagle, Marshall wrote, "In response to the allegations put forward in the media, I simply state unequivocally that I have never physically struck a player or colleague. Allegations claiming otherwise are false."

== Head coaching record ==
Record table
Season	Team	Overall	Conference	Standing	Postseason
Winthrop Eagles (Big South Conference) (1998–2007)
1998–99	Winthrop	21–8	9–1	1st	NCAA Division I Round of 64
1999–00	Winthrop	21–9	11–3	2nd	NCAA Division I Round of 64
2000–01	Winthrop	18–13	11–3	2nd	NCAA Division I Round of 64
2001–02	Winthrop	19–12	10–4	1st	NCAA Division I Round of 64
2002–03	Winthrop	20–10	11–3	1st	
2003–04	Winthrop	16–12	10–6	T–3rd	
2004–05	Winthrop	27–6	15–1	1st	NCAA Division I Round of 64
2005–06	Winthrop	23–8	13–3	1st	NCAA Division I Round of 64
2006–07	Winthrop	29–5	14–0	1st	NCAA Division I Round of 32
Winthrop:		194–83 (.700)	104–24 (.813)		
Wichita State Shockers (Missouri Valley Conference) (2007–2017)
2007–08	Wichita State	11–20	4–14	9th	
2008–09	Wichita State	17–17	8–10	T–5th	CBI Second Round
2009–10	Wichita State	25–10	12–6	2nd	NIT First Round
2010–11	Wichita State	29–8	14–4	2nd	NIT champion
2011–12	Wichita State	27–6	16–2	1st	NCAA Division I Round of 64
2012–13	Wichita State	30–9	12–6	2nd	NCAA Division I Final Four
2013–14	Wichita State	35–1	18–0	1st	NCAA Division I Round of 32
2014–15	Wichita State	30–5	17–1	1st	NCAA Division I Sweet 16
2015–16	Wichita State	26–9	16–2	1st	NCAA Division I Round of 32
2016–17	Wichita State	31–5	17–1	T–1st	NCAA Division I Round of 32
Wichita State Shockers (American Athletic Conference) (2017–2020)
2017–18	Wichita State	25–8	14–4	T–2nd	NCAA Division I Round of 64
2018–19	Wichita State	22–15	10–8	6th	NIT Semifinal
2019–20	Wichita State	23–8	11–7	4th	N/A*
Wichita State:		331–121 (.732)	171–55 (.757)		
Total:		525–204 (.720)			
National champion Postseason invitational champion Conference regular season champion Conference regular season and conference tournament champion Division regular season champion Division regular season and conference tournament champion Conference tournament champion

*All postseason tournaments were cancelled due to the COVID-19 pandemic

== See also ==
- List of NCAA Division I Men's Final Four appearances by coach
