= Greg Lewis (basketball) =

American basketball player

Personal information
- Born: September 6, 1978 (age 48) Akron, Ohio, U.S.
- Listed height: 6 ft 6 in (1.98 m)
- Listed weight: 215 lb (98 kg)

Career information
- High school: Akron East (Akron, Ohio); Medina First Baptist (Akron, Ohio)
- College: Seward CC (1997–1998); Howard College (1998–1999); Winthrop (1999–2002)
- NBA draft: 2002: undrafted
- Playing career: 2002–2015
- Position: Power forward
- Number: 42

Career history
- 2002–2003: KTP-Basket
- 2003: Brevard Blue Ducks
- 2003–2004: Londrina
- 2004: Chicago Soldiers
- 2005: Waikato Titans
- 2006: Marinos
- 2006: Soles de Mexicali
- 2006–2012: ???
- 2012: La Union
- 2012–2013: Atenas
- 2013: Marinos
- 2013–2014: Atenas
- 2014–2015: San Martín de Corrientes

Career highlights
- LNBP All-Star (2006); Big South Player of the Year (2002); 2× First Team All-Big South (2000, 2002); 2× Big South tournament MVP (2000, 2002); AP Honorable Mention All-American (2002)

Gregory Devon Lewis (born September 6, 1978) is an American former professional basketball player. In college, he was the Big South Conference player of the year as a senior in 2001–02. He was also a two-time Big South tournament MVP in 2000 and 2002. Since graduating he has played professionally in numerous countries, and in 2012–13 he was named Latinbasket.com's All-Liga Americas MVP while playing for Asociación Deportiva Atenas in Argentina.

== Early years ==
Greg Lewis grew up in Akron, Ohio without a father and admitted that he was "a little wild" as a youth. He would run away from home, and his grades at Akron East High School suffered due to his absences (he had to repeat his sophomore year because he missed 160 days of school). Lewis became more focused when he met an ordained minister by the name of John Saucier. Saucier had started Team JAM (Jesus, Athletics, Ministry), a basketball program used to create better role models out of troubled or disadvantaged high schoolers. Saucier also convinced Lewis to attend Medina First Baptist School for a fifth year of high school due to his grades at Akron East. In his final prep year, Lewis increased his grade point average from 0.9 at Akron East to 2.9 by graduation at Medina. On the basketball court, he averaged 29.6 points and 13 rebounds per game en route to all-state honors.

== College ==
Unable to play for an NCAA Division I right away, Lewis signed to play for Seward County Community College in Kansas, but due to frequent run-ins with their head coach, he stayed only one semester. The following year, Lewis enrolled at Howard College in Texas, where he averaged 17.9 points and 8.0 rebounds per game and led the team to a 26–6 record. After his year at Howard, he wanted to play for the University of South Alabama, but his mother would not sign the scholarship papers because she felt uncomfortable with that decision, citing that they "did not have his best interest at heart."

Winthrop University, whose team needed one more forward, still had one scholarship left to offer, so coach Gregg Marshall offered it to Lewis. He accepted, and in 1999–2000 he began his Division I career as a Winthrop Eagle. In his first season averaged 15.7 points and 6.7 rebounds per game, was named the Big South tournament MVP as well as an All-Big South First Team selection. They entered the 2000 NCAA tournament as a 14-seed but lost to Oklahoma, a three-seed, in the first round.

In 2000–01, in what should have been Lewis' true senior season, he sustained a foot injury just six games into the season that sidelined him for the whole year. The NCAA gave him a medical redshirt, thus his final collegiate season was actually in 2001–02. That year, Lewis averaged 15.4 points, 10.1 rebounds, and 1.5 steals per game. The Eagles were co-champions of the Big South regular season and once again won the Big South tournament where they earned a berth into the NCAA tournament. Lewis was named the conference tournament's MVP for a second time as well as another All-Big South First Team selection. He was named the Big South Player of the Year as well as an Honorable Mention All-American by the Associated Press. The Eagles lost to the Duke Blue Devils in the first round of the NCAA Tournament, ending Lewis' collegiate career. He finished his career at Winthrop with 993 points and 542 rebounds in 67 games played.

== Professional ==
Lewis was not selected in the 2002 NBA draft. He has been a journeyman throughout his career, playing in leagues in the United States, Argentina, Brazil, Venezuela, Paraguay, New Zealand, Mexico, and Finland. In 2012–13 he was named Latinbasket.com's All-Liga Americas MVP while playing for Asociación Deportiva Atenas in Argentina.
