= List of University of North Carolina at Asheville people =

The University of North Carolina at Asheville (UNC Asheville) is a public liberal arts university in Asheville, North Carolina, United States. It was previously known as Buncombe County Junior College (1927 to 1930), Biltmore Junior College (1930 to 1934), Biltmore College (1934 to 1936), and Asheville-Biltmore College (1936 to 1969). Following are some of the notable people associated with the Universith of North Carolina at Asheville.

== Notable alumni ==
=== Academia ===
- Autumn Kent – professor of mathematics and Vilas associate at the University of Wisconsin

=== Arts ===
- Timothy Lee Barnwell – photographer and author

=== Entertainment ===
- Molly Burch (2012) – singer-songwriter
- Cliff Cash – stand-up comedian
- Michael Cogdill (1984) – news anchor, screenwriter, film producer, and novelist
- Jason Faunt (1997) – actor
- Karly Hartzman – songwriter and musician
- Veronica Johnson – meteorologist at WJLA-TV
- MJ Lenderman – singer-songwriter
- Topper Shutt – meteorologist at WUSA Channel 9
- Jethro Waters – Emmy Award winning filmmaker

=== Literature and journalism ===
- Sarah Addison Allen – author
- Anne-Marie Baiynd – author and financial analyst
- Wiley Cash – author
- Wilma Dykeman – writer and environmentalist
- Ann B. Ross (1984) – author and college professor

=== Politics ===
- Claude DeBruhl, North Carolina House of Representatives
- Roy A. Taylor – member of U.S. Congress

=== Sports ===
==== Baseball ====
- Tony Campana – professional baseball player with the Chicago Cubs and Arizona Diamondbacks
- Ryan Dull – professional baseball player with the Oakland Athletics, New York Yankees, and Toronto Blue Jays
- Todd Interdonato – head baseball coach at Boston College
- Kevin Mattison – professional baseball player for the Miami Marlins
- Mike Shildt (1993) – professional baseball manager of the St. Louis Cardinals, San Diego Padres, and Baltimore Orioles
- Ty Wigginton – professional baseball player for the New York Mets, Pittsburgh Pirates, Tampa Bay Devil Rays, Houston Astros, Baltimore Orioles, Colorado Rockies, Philadelphia Phillies, and St. Louis Cardinals

==== Basketball ====
- Kenny George – second tallest player in NCAA men's basketball history
- Joey Harrell – professional basketball player
- Keith Hornsby – professional basketball player
- Nick McDevitt (2001) – college basketball coach
- Drew Pember – professional basketball player
- Josh Pittman – professional basketball player
- J. P. Primm – basketball player
- Jaleel Roberts – professional basketball player
- Andrew Rowsey – professional basketball player
- Jalen Seegars – professional basketball player
- Bryan Smithson – professional basketball player
- Dwayne Sutton – professional basketball player
- MaCio Teague – professional basketball player
- L. J. Thorpe – professional basketball player

==== MFA ====
- Alana McLaughlin – mixed martial arts fighter

==== Soccer ====
- Lassi Hurskainen – professional soccer player
- Susana Žigante – professional soccer player

==== Tennis ====
- Henry Patten – tennis player

== Notable faculty and staff ==
=== Academics ===
- Mildred Barya – poet and author
- Wiley Cash – author and writer in residence
- Richard Chess – literature and language professor and director of the Center for Jewish Studies and the Creative Writing Program
- Michael Cogdill – news anchor, screenwriter, film producer, and novelist
- Jane Fernandes – former provost and vice-chancellor
- Grant Hardy – historian
- David Brendan Hopes – professor of literature
- Elliot Mazer – audio engineer and record producer
- Robert Moog – inventor of the Moog synthesizer and former research professor of music
- Christopher Oakley – animator and professor of new media
- Ann B. Ross – literature instructor
- Sylvia Wilkinson – author and former faculty

=== Athletics ===
- Steve Adlard – former director of soccer and former professional soccer player
- Eddie Biedenbach – former men's basketball coach and professional basketball player
- Jim Bretz – former baseball coach
- Herbert Coman – former football coach
- Janet Cone – athletic director
- Michelle Demko – former women's soccer coach
- Don Doucette – former basketball coach
- Ed Farrell – former athletic director
- Scott Friedholm – baseball coach
- Jerry Green – former basketball coach
- Nick McDevitt – former basketball coach
- Katie Meier – former assistant women's basketball coach
- Brenda Mock Brown – former women's basketball head coach
- Mike Morrell – head basketball coach
- Matt Myers – former baseball coach
- Ryan Odom – former assistant basketball coach
- Matt Reid – former baseball coach
- Mike Roberts – former baseball coach
- Tom Smith – former baseball coach
- Sammy Stewart – former baseball coach and former professional baseball player
- Monte Towe – former assistant basketball coach
