= UNC Asheville Bulldogs men's basketball statistical leaders =

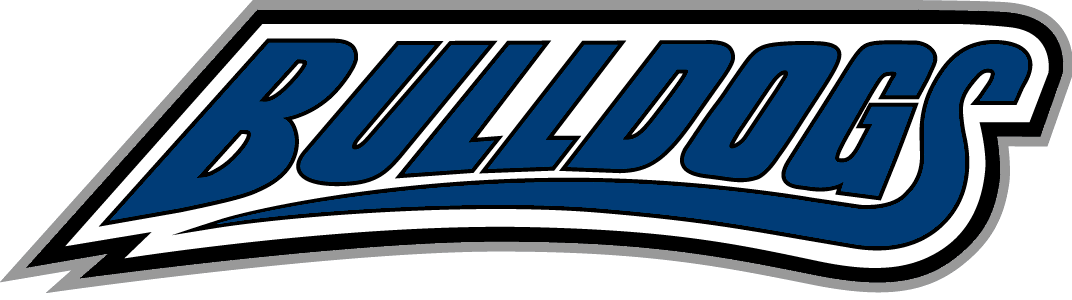

The UNC Asheville Bulldogs basketball statistical leaders are individual statistical leaders of the UNC Asheville Bulldogs men's basketball program in various categories, including points, assists, blocks, rebounds, and steals. Within those areas, the lists identify single-game, single-season, and career leaders. The Bulldogs represent the University of North Carolina at Asheville in the NCAA's Big South Conference.

UNC Asheville began competing in intercollegiate basketball in 1964. The NCAA did not officially record assists as a stat until the 1983–84 season, and blocks and steals until the 1985–86 season, but UNC Asheville's record books includes players in these stats before these seasons. These lists are updated through the end of the 2020–21 season.

== Scoring ==
Career
Rk	Player	Points	Seasons
1	Tajion Jones	1,987	2018–19 2019–20 2020–21 2021–22 2022–23
2	Bamford Jones	1,919	1974–75 1975–76 1976–77 1977–78
3	Jim McElhaney	1,904	1966–67 1967–68 1968–69 1969–70 1970–71
4	Drew Pember	1,902	2021–22 2022–23 2023–24
5	Matt Dickey	1,778	2008–09 2009–10 2010–11 2011–12
6	Paul Allen	1,693	1980–81 1981–82 1982–83 1983–84
7	J. P. Primm	1,689	2008–09 2009–10 2010–11 2011–12
8	Ahmad Thomas	1,626	2014–15 2015–16 2016–17 2017–18
9	Josh Pittman	1,547	1994–95 1995–96 1996–97 1997–98
10	George Gilbert	1,523	1976–77 1977–78 1978–79 1979–80

Season
Rk	Player	Points	Season
1	Drew Pember	733	2022–23
2	Drew Pember	681	2023–24
3	Andrew Rowsey	648	2013–14

Single game
Rk	Player	Points	Season	Opponent
1	Drew Pember	48	2022–23	Presbyterian
2	Mickey Gibson	44	1969–70	Washington & Lee

== Rebounds ==
Career
Rk	Player	Rebounds	Seasons
1	Rod Healy	1121	1967–68 1968–69 1969–70 1970–71
2	Tony Bumphus	968	1974–75 1975–76 1976–77 1977–78
3	Pat Jolley	847	1980–81 1981–82 1982–83 1983–84
4	D.J. Cunningham	819	2009–10 2010–11 2012–13 2013–14
5	Drew Pember	795	2021–22 2022–23 2023–24
6	Ahmad Thomas	705	2014–15 2015–16 2016–17 2017–18
7	Brent Keck	703	1987–88 1988–89 1989–90 1990–91
8	Chris Lee	701	1967–68 1968–69 1969–70 1970–71
9	John Williams	684	2007–08 2008–09 2009–10 2010–11
10	Tajion Jones	669	2018–19 2019–20 2020–21 2021–22 2022–23

Season
Rk	Player	Rebounds	Season
1	Frank Rhyne	393	1973–74

Single game
Rk	Player	Rebounds	Season	Opponent
1	Rod Healy	30	1969–70	Belmont-Abbey

== Assists ==
Career
Rk	Player	Assists	Seasons
1	J. P. Primm	607	2008–09 2009–10 2010–11 2011–12
2	K.J. Garland	520	2003–04 2004–05 2006–07 2007–08
3	George Gilbert	460	1976–77 1977–78 1978–79 1979–80
4	Josh Kohn	430	1992–93 1993–94 1994–95 1995–96
5	Matt Dickey	429	2008–09 2009–10 2010–11 2011–12
6	Kevin Vannatta	378	2014–15 2015–16 2016–17 2017–18
7	Maurice Caldwell	370	1986–87 1987–88 1988–89 1989–90
8	Andre Smith	358	1999–00 2000–01 2001–02 2002–03
9	Jeff Lippard	343	1990–91 1991–92
10	Bamford Jones	319	1974–75 1975–76 1976–77 1977–78
	Caleb Burgess	319	2022–23 2023–24

Season
Rk	Player	Assists	Season
1	Mike Grace	205	1973–74

Single game
Rk	Player	Assists	Season	Opponent
1	Jeff Lippard	14	1990–91	Charleston Southern

== Steals ==
Career
Rk	Player	Steals	Seasons
1	Ahmad Thomas	251	2014–15 2015–16 2016–17 2017–18
2	J. P. Primm	248	2008–09 2009–10 2010–11 2011–12
3	Andre Smith	223	1999–00 2000–01 2001–02 2002–03
4	Matt Dickey	188	2008–09 2009–10 2010–11 2011–12
5	Trent Stephney	187	2019–20 2020–21 2021–22 2022–23 2023–24
6	Josh Pittman	175	1994–95 1995–96 1996–97 1997–98
7	Josh Kohn	162	1992–93 1993–94 1994–95 1995–96
8	K.J. Garland	153	2003–04 2004–05 2006–07 2007–08
9	Paul Allen	147	1980–81 1981–82 1982–83 1983–84
	Bryan McCullough	147	2001–02 2002–03 2003–04 2004–05

Season
Rk	Player	Steals	Season
1	Ahmad Thomas	99	2016–17

Single game
Rk	Player	Steals	Season	Opponent
1	Ahmad Thomas	10	2016–17	Warren Wilson

== Blocks ==
Career
Rk	Player	Blocks	Seasons
1	D.J. Cunningham	278	2009–10 2010–11 2012–13 2013–14
2	John Williams	255	2007–08 2008–09 2009–10 2010–11
3	Drew Pember	236	2021–22 2022–23 2023–24
4	C.J. Walker	190	2003–04 2004–05 2005–06 2006–07
5	Pat Jolley	164	1980–81 1981–82 1982–83 1983–84
6	Robert Stevenson	163	1994–95 1995–96 1996–97 1997–98
7	Adam Earnhardt	160	1997–98 1998–99 1999–00 2000–01
8	Kenny George	140	2006–07 2007–08
9	Jaleel Roberts	129	2011–12 2012–13 2013–14 2014–15
10	Toyaz Solomon	123	2023–24 2024–25 2025–26

Season
Rk	Player	Blocks	Season
1	D.J. Cunningham	98	2013–14

Single game
Rk	Player	Blocks	Season	Opponent
1	Kenny George	10	2007–08	Lees-McRae
	Kenny George	10	2007–08	Campbell
