= 2010–11 VMI Keydets basketball team =

American college basketball season

2010–11 VMI Keydets basketball
- Conference: Big South Conference
- Record: 18–13 (10–8 Big South)
- Head coach: Duggar Baucom (6th season)
- Assistant coaches: Daniel Willis (6th season); Jack Castleberry (3rd season); Jason Allison (6th season)
- Home arena: Cameron Hall

2010–11 Big South men's basketball standings
	Conf.				Overall
Team	W		L	PCT	W		L	PCT
Coastal Carolina	16	–	2	.889	28	–	6	.824
Liberty	13	–	5	.722	19	–	13	.594
† UNC Asheville	11	–	7	.611	20	–	14	.588
VMI	10	–	8	.556	18	–	13	.581
Charleston Southern	9	–	9	.500	16	–	16	.500
Winthrop	9	–	9	.500	13	–	17	.433
High Point	7	–	11	.389	12	–	19	.387
Presbyterian	7	–	11	.389	13	–	18	.419
Gardner-Webb	6	–	12	.333	11	–	21	.344
Radford	2	–	16	.111	5	–	24	.172
† 2011 Big South tournament winner As of March 16, 2011; Rankings from AP Poll

The 2010–11 VMI Keydets basketball team represented the Virginia Military Institute during the 2010-11 NCAA Division I men's basketball season. The Keydets were coached by Duggar Baucom in his 6th year at VMI, and played their home games at Cameron Hall. It was VMI's 7th season in the Big South Conference, which they have competed in since 2003. VMI finished the year 18–13, 10–8 in the Big South, and lost in the semifinals of the 2011 Big South Conference men's basketball tournament to Coastal Carolina, 89–81. For the fifth straight year, VMI lead the country in points per game and 3-pointers made.

== Roster ==
2010–11 VMI Keydets men's basketball team
Players
Coaches

Pos.	#	Name	Height	Weight	Year	Hometown
G	1	Rodney Glasgow Jr.	5 ft 10 in (1.78 m)	170 lb (77 kg)	Fr	Olney, MD
G	5	Drew Absher	5 ft 10 in (1.78 m)	170 lb (77 kg)	Fr	Mocksville, NC
G	10	Austin Kenon	5 ft 11 in (1.8 m)	180 lb (82 kg)	Sr	Virginia Beach, VA
F	11	Stan Okoye	6 ft 5 in (1.96 m)	205 lb (93 kg)	So	Raleigh, NC
G	14	Joe Carr	6 ft 3 in (1.91 m)	195 lb (88 kg)	So	Houston, TX
F	15	Ron Burks	6 ft 4 in (1.93 m)	215 lb (98 kg)	Jr	Mitchellville, MD
G	21	Keith Gabriel	6 ft 4 in (1.93 m)	185 lb (84 kg)	Jr	Charlotte, NC
F/C	24	D. J. Covington	6 ft 9 in (2.06 m)	235 lb (107 kg)	Fr	Virginia Beach, VA
F	30	Nick Gore	6 ft 6 in (1.98 m)	220 lb (100 kg)	So	Waynesboro, VA
G	31	Michael Sparks	6 ft 4 in (1.93 m)	195 lb (88 kg)	Jr	Lexington, KY
C	32	Wayne Whiting	6 ft 7 in (2.01 m)	240 lb (109 kg)	Jr	Richmond Hill, GA
C	50	Stephen Sargent	7 ft 0 in (2.13 m)	275 lb (125 kg)	RS Jr	Fayetteville, GA

Head coach

- Duggar Baucom

Assistant coach(es)

- Daniel Willis
- Jack Castleberry
- Jason Allison

Legend

- (C) Team captain
- (S) Suspended
- (I) Ineligible
- (W) Walk-on
- Injured
- Current redshirt

== Schedule ==
Date time, TV	Rank^{#}	Opponent^{#}	Result	Record	Site (attendance) city, state
Regular Season
November 12*; 7:00 pm		Randolph	W 106–65	1–0	Cameron Hall (2,584); Lexington, VA
November 14*; 3:00 pm		at UMBC	W 94–77	2–0	Retriever Activities Center (1,910); Baltimore, MD
November 16*; 7:00 pm		Virginia–Wise	W 120–88	3–0	Cameron Hall (1,129); Lexington, VA
November 18*; 7:00 pm		Jacksonville State	W 65–55	4–0	Cameron Hall (1,753); Lexington, VA
November 23*; 7:00 pm		Southern Virginia	W 94–78	5–0	Cameron Hall (812); Lexington, VA
November 27*; 7:00 pm, MASN		vs. West Virginia	L 66–82	5–1	Charleston Civic Center (12,367); Charleston, WV
November 29*; 7:00 pm		Central Penn	W 151–92	6–1	Cameron Hall (721); Lexington, VA
December 2; 7:00 pm		Winthrop	L 82–88 ^{OT}	6–2 (0–1)	Cameron Hall (1,864); Lexington, VA
December 4; 1:00 pm		Presbyterian	L 78–92	6–3 (0–2)	Cameron Hall (2,898); Lexington, VA
December 8*; 7:30 pm		at VCU	L 80–86	6–4	Siegel Center (6,023); Richmond, Virginia
December 11*; 1:00 pm		Longwood	W 114–82	7–4	Cameron Hall (3,212); Lexington, VA
December 19*; 4:00 pm		at Marshall	L 70–98	7–5	Cam Henderson Center (4,819); Huntington, WV
December 31; 2:00 pm		at UNC Asheville	W 83–72	8–5 (1–2)	Justice Center (989); Asheville, NC
January 2; 3:00 pm		at Gardner–Webb	W 97–76	9–5 (2–2)	Paul Porter Arena (300); Boiling Springs, NC
January 6; 7:00 pm		Coastal Carolina	L 87–109	9–6 (2–3)	Cameron Hall (1,238); Lexington, VA
January 8; 7:00 pm		Charleston Southern	L 80–88	9–7 (2–4)	Cameron Hall (1,146); Lexington, VA
January 13; 7:00 pm		at Radford	W 105–71	10–7 (3–4)	Dedmon Center (806); Radford, VA
January 15; 7:00 pm		at High Point	W 97–91	11–7 (4–4)	Millis Center (1,519); High Point, NC
January 20; 7:00 pm, ESPN3		at Liberty	L 82–100	11–8 (4–5)	Vines Center (4,488); Lynchburg, VA
January 27; 7:00 pm		Gardner–Webb	W 85–66	12–8 (5–5)	Cameron Hall (1,053); Lexington, VA
January 29; 1:00 pm		UNC Asheville	L 87–100	12–9 (5–6)	Cameron Hall (3,157); Lexington, VA
February 3; 7:30 pm		at Charleston Southern	L 90–101	12–10 (5–7)	CSU Field House (731); Charleston, SC
February 5; 4:30 pm		at Coastal Carolina	L 86–99	12–11 (5–8)	Kimbel Arena (1,039); Conway, SC
February 10; 7:00 pm		High Point	W 87–74	13–11 (6–8)	Cameron Hall (1,658); Lexington, VA
February 12; 1:00 pm		Radford	W 71–58	14–11 (7–8)	Cameron Hall (3,510); Lexington, VA
February 15; 7:00 pm		Liberty	W 79–69	15–11 (8–8)	Cameron Hall (1,836); Lexington, VA
February 19; 4:00 pm		at Morgan State; ESPN BracketBusters	L 62–67	15–12	Hill Field House (1,354); Baltimore, MD
February 24; 7:00 pm		at Presbyterian	W 80–74	16–12 (9–8)	Templeton Physical Education Center (648); Clinton, SC
February 26; 7:00 pm, MASN		at Winthrop	W 89–85	17–12 (10–8)	Winthrop Coliseum (2,458); Rock Hill, SC
Big South tournament
March 1; 7:00 pm	(4)	(5) Winthrop; Big South Quarterfinals	W 78–73	18–12	Cameron Hall (3,217); Lexington, VA
March 3; 8:00 pm, ESPNU	(4)	at (1) Coastal Carolina; Big South Semifinals	L 81–89	18–13	Kimbel Arena (1,345); Conway, SC
*Non-conference game. ^{#}Rankings from AP Poll. (#) Tournament seedings in parentheses. All times are in Eastern Time.
