= 2010–11 Liberty Flames basketball team =

American college basketball season

2010–11 Liberty Flames men's basketball
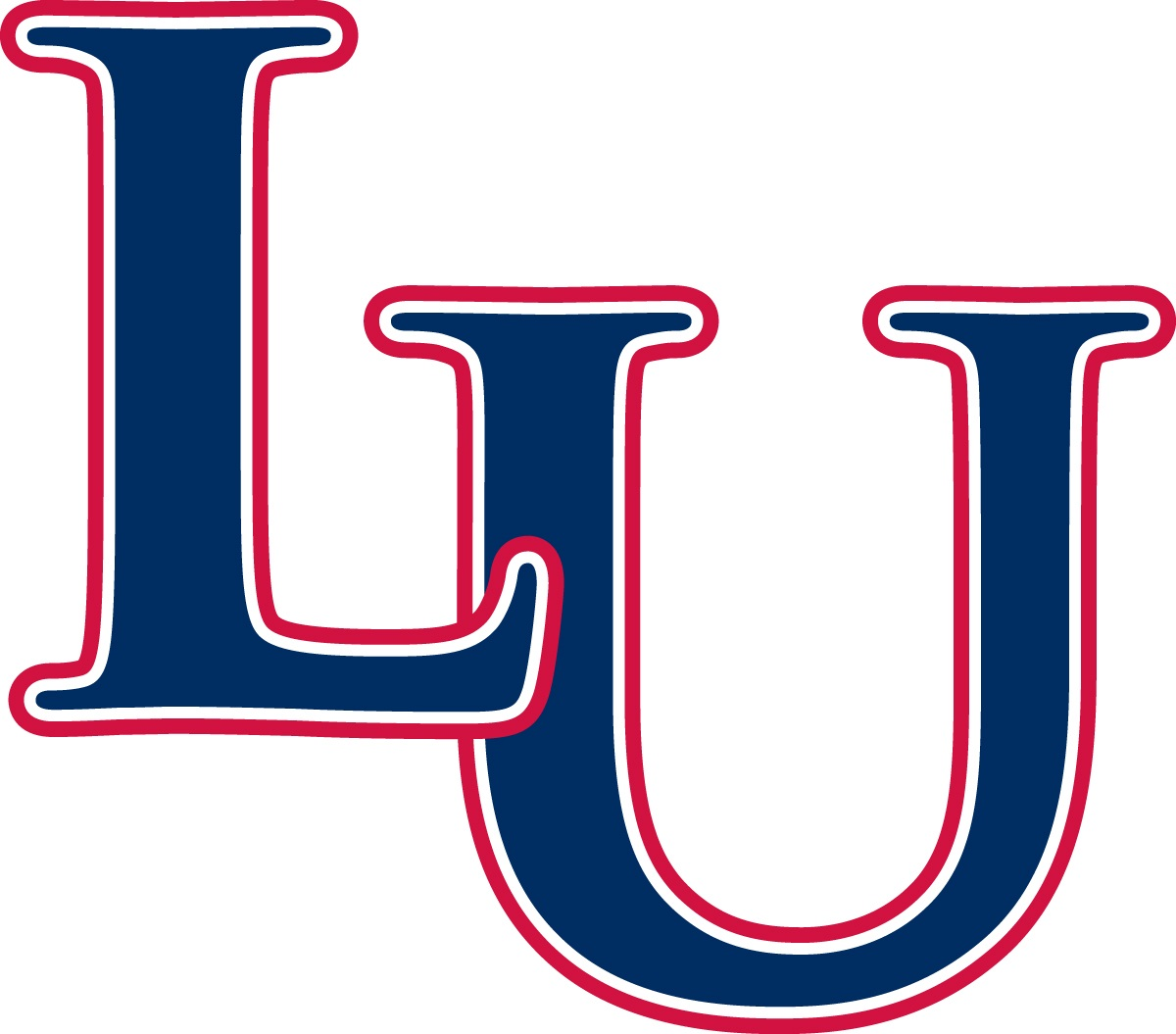
- Conference: Big South Conference
- Record: 19–3 (13–5 Big South)
- Head coach: Dale Layer (2nd season)
- Assistant coaches: Jason Eaker; Myron Guillory; Brian Joyce
- Home arena: Vines Center

2010–11 Big South men's basketball standings
	Conf.				Overall
Team	W		L	PCT	W		L	PCT
Coastal Carolina	16	–	2	.889	28	–	6	.824
Liberty	13	–	5	.722	19	–	13	.594
† UNC Asheville	11	–	7	.611	20	–	14	.588
VMI	10	–	8	.556	18	–	13	.581
Charleston Southern	9	–	9	.500	16	–	16	.500
Winthrop	9	–	9	.500	13	–	17	.433
High Point	7	–	11	.389	12	–	19	.387
Presbyterian	7	–	11	.389	13	–	18	.419
Gardner-Webb	6	–	12	.333	11	–	21	.344
Radford	2	–	16	.111	5	–	24	.172
† 2011 Big South tournament winner As of March 16, 2011; Rankings from AP Poll

The 2010–11 Liberty Flames basketball team represented Liberty University during the 2010–11 NCAA Division I men's basketball season. The Flames, led by second year head coach Dale Layer, played their home games at the Vines Center and were members of the Big South Conference.

== Previous season ==
The Flames finished the 2009–10 season 15–16, 10–8 in Big South play to finish in sixth place. They lost in the quarterfinals of the Big South tournament to Winthrop.

== Departures ==
Name	Number	Pos.	Height	Weight	Year	Hometown	Notes
Tyler Baker	3	Forward	6'9"	215	RS Senior	Albuquerque, New Mexico	Graduated
Patrick Konan	23	Forward	6'5"	205	Freshman	Abidjan, Ivory Coast	Transferred to New Hampshire
Kyle Ohman	11	Guard/Forward	6'4"	200	Senior	Indianapolis	Graduated
Chris Perez	23	Guard	6'3"	210	Freshman	Santiago, FL	Transferred to Stetson
Johnny Stephene	1	Guard	6'1"	200	Sophomore	Boynton Beach, FL	Transferred to Central Oklahoma
Bill Weaver	34	Guard	6'4"	200	Sophomore	Hampton, VA	Transferred to Mercyhurst

== Roster ==
2010–11 Liberty Flames men's basketball team
Players
Coaches

Pos.	#	Name	Height	Weight	Year	Hometown
G	1	Garen Lafser	6 ft 1 in (1.85 m)	180 lb (82 kg)	Jr	St. Louis
G	2	Chene Phillips	6 ft 2 in (1.88 m)	170 lb (77 kg)	Fr	Detroit
G	4	James Spencer	6 ft 1 in (1.85 m)	190 lb (86 kg)	Fr	Newport News, Virginia
G	5	Tanner Hoyt	6 ft 6 in (1.98 m)	185 lb (84 kg)	Jr	Winterville, North Carolina
G	10	Evan Gordan	6 ft 0 in (1.83 m)	192 lb (87 kg)	So	Indianapolis
G	12	Jeremy Anderson	6 ft 4 in (1.93 m)	200 lb (91 kg)	Jr	Bowling Green, Kentucky
G	14	David Minaya	6 ft 6 in (1.98 m)	205 lb (93 kg)	RS Jr	Riverview, Florida
G	20	John Brown	6 ft 4 in (1.93 m)	200 lb (91 kg)	RS Jr	Savannah, Georgia
C	21	Joel Vander Pol	6 ft 10 in (2.08 m)	230 lb (104 kg)	RS Fr	Fort Myers, Florida
G	22	Asaad Woods	6 ft 4 in (1.93 m)	210 lb (95 kg)	Fr	Chandler, Arizona
F	24	Antwan Burrus	6 ft 6 in (1.98 m)	220 lb (100 kg)	So	Winterville, North Carolina
G	25	Jesse Sanders	6 ft 3 in (1.91 m)	200 lb (91 kg)	Jr	Sugar Land, Texas
G	33	John Caleb Sanders	6 ft 0 in (1.83 m)	180 lb (82 kg)	Fr	Sugar Land, Texas
C	41	Carter McMasters	6 ft 11 in (2.11 m)	210 lb (95 kg)	So	Chattanooga, Tennessee
F	42	Sommy Ogukwe	6 ft 7 in (2.01 m)	230 lb (104 kg)	Fr	Abuja, Nigeria

Head coach

- Dale Layer (Eckerd)

Assistant coach(es)

- Jason Eaker (Texas–Pan American)
- Matt Olinger (Virginia Tech)
- Brian Joyce (Oklahoma Christian)

Legend

- (C) Team captain
- (S) Suspended
- (I) Ineligible
- (W) Walk-on
- Injured
- Current redshirt

Roster
Last update: 2020-12-18

== Schedule and results ==
Date time, TV	Rank^{#}	Opponent^{#}	Result	Record	High points	High rebounds	High assists	Site (attendance) city, state
Regular season
11/12/2010*; 7:00 pm		Virginia Intermont	W 82-64	1–0	23 – Gordan	17 – Brown	7 – Jesse Sanders	Vines Center (3,717); Lynchburg, VA
11/14/2010*; 2:00 pm		at Notre Dame	L 51-72	1–1	12 – Minaya	12 – Brown	5 – Jesse Sanders	Purcell Pavilion (6,478); Notre Dame, IN
11/16/2010*; 7:00 pm		UNC Wilmington	L 64-69 ^{OT}	1-2	16 – Burrus	9 – Jesse Sanders	8 – Jesse Sanders	Trask Coliseum (3,374); Wilmington, NC
11/18/2010*; 7:00 pm		Southern Virginia	W 82-49	2–2	14 – Gordon	9 – Brown	7 – Jesse Sanders	Vines Center (1,241); Lynchburg, VA
11/21/2010*; 1:00 pm		at Texas Tech; South Padre Island Invitational	L 71-79	2–3	18 – Gordon	10 – Brown	7 – Jesse Sanders	United Spirit Arena (8,856); Lubbock, TX
11/23/2010*; 7:00 pm		at South Florida; South Padre Island Invitational	L 43-60	2–4	15 – Gordon	4 – 3 Tied	5 – Jesse Sanders	Yuengling Center (2,860); Tampa, FL
11/26/2010*; 2:30 pm		vs. Mississippi Valley State; South Padre Island Invitational	W 64-58	3-4	12 – Minaya	11 – Burrus	4 – Jesse Sanders	South Padre Island Convention Centre; South Padre Island, TX
11/27/2010*; 2:10 pm		vs. Chicago State; South Padre Island Invitational	W 67-65	4-4	16 – Brown	15 – Brown	7 – Jesse Sanders	South Padre Island Convention Centre; South Padre Island, TX
12/2/2010; 7:00 pm		Presbyterian	W 70-61	5-4 (1-0)	23 – Brown	13 – Brown	7 – Jesse Sanders	Vines Center (1,507); Lynchburg, VA
12/4/2010; 7:00 pm		Winthrop	W 75-72	6–4 (2-0)	26 – Gordon	10 – Jesse Sanders	8 – Jesse Sanders	Vines Center (1,719); Lynchburg, VA
12/11/2010*; 7:00 pm		George Mason	L 54-84	6–5	12 – Tied	7 – Brown	5 – Jesse Sanders	Vines Center (2,747); Lynchburg, VA
12/18/2010*; 7:00 pm		William & Mary	W 71-64	7–5	19 – Gordon	12 – Brown	7 – Jesse Sanders	Vines Center (1,124); Lynchburg, VA
12/22/2010*; 7:00 pm		Hampton	L 59-62	7–6	15 – Gordon	11 – Brown	5 – Jesse Sanders	Hampton Convocation Center (765); Hampton, VA
12/28/2010*; 7:00 pm		Union (KY)	W 84-47	2–3	14 – Minaya	7 – Brown	8 – Jesse Sanders	Vines Center (1,525); Lynchburg, VA
12/31/2010; 5:30 pm		at Gardner–Webb	W 64-62 ^{OT}	9–6 (3-0)	19 – Tied	7 – Burrus	4 – Jesse Sanders	Paul Porter Arena (1,540); Boiling Springs, NC
1/2/2011; 2:00 pm		at UNC Asheville	W 59-55	10–6 (4-0)	16 – Jesse Sanders	7 – Brown	3 – Tied	Justice Center (767); Asheville, NC
1/6/2011; 7:00 pm		Charleston Southern	W 68-54	11-6 (5-0)	15 – Gordon	12 – Brown	10 – Jesse Sanders	Vines Center (848); Lynchburg, VA
1/8/2011; 6:00 pm		Coastal Carolina	W 70-67	11-7 (5-1)	17 – Gordon	13 – Brown	7 – Jesse Sanders	Vines Center (1,471); Lynchburg, VA
1/13/2011; 7:00 pm		at High Point	W 66-60	12-7 (6-1)	14 – Brown	10 – Brown	4 – Jesse Sanders	Millis Center (1,602); High Point, NC
1/15/2011; 7:00 pm		at Radford	W 61-53	13-7 (7-1)	13 – Minaya	14 – Brown	6 – Jesse Sanders	Dedmon Center (884); Radford, VA
1/20/2011; 7:00 pm		VMI	W 100-82	14–7 (8-1)	22 – Minaya	9 – Brown	13 – Jesse Sanders	Vines Center (4,488); Lynchburg, VA
1/27/2011; 7:00 pm		UNC Asheville	W 83-81 ^{OT}	15–7 (9-1)	20 – Jesse Sanders	12 – Brown	7 – Jesse Sanders	Vines Center (4,349); Lynchburg, VA
1/29/2011; 7:00 pm		Gardner–Webb	W 67-51	16-7 (10-1)	16 – Gordon	16 – Brown	7 – Jesse Sanders	Vines Center (3,920); Lynchburg, VA
2/3/2011; 7:00 pm		at Coastal Carolina	L 71-77	16–8 (10-2)	26 – Gordon	11 – Brown	3 – Jesse Sanders	Kimbel Arena (1,039); Conway, SC
2/5/2011; 4:30 pm		at Charleston Southern	W 70-69	17–8 (11-2)	17 – Gordon	10 – Brown	5 – Jesse Sanders	Buccaneer Field House (881); North Charleston, SC
2/10/2011; 7:00 pm		Radford	W 79-71	18–8 (12-2)	20 – Gordon	13 – Brown	6 – Jesse Sanders	Vines Center (4,258); Lynchburg, VA
2/12/2011; 8:00 pm		High Point	W 65-54	19-8 (13-2)	16 – Tied	11 – Jesse Sanders	4 – Jesse Sanders	Vines Center (5,296); Lynchburg, VA
2/15/2011; 7:00 pm		at VMI	L 69-79	19–9 (13-3)	22 – Brown	16 – Brown	4 – Tied	Cameron Hall (1,836); Lexington, VA
2/19/2011*; 7:00 pm		Iona; ESPN BracketBusters	W 77-57	19–10	13 – Jesse Sanders	12 – Brown	3 – Brown	Vines Center (4,931); Lynchburg, VA
2/24/2011; 7:10 pm		at Winthrop	L 56-61	19–11 (13-4)	19 – Jesse Sanders	10 – Brown	2 – Tied	Winthrop Coliseum (1,381); Rock Hill, SC
2/26/2011; 7:35 pm		at Presbyterian	L 66-73	19–12 (13-5)	18 – Minaya	7 – Brown	3 – Phillips	Templeton Center (702); Clinton, SC
Big South tournament
3/1/2011; 7:00 pm	(2)	(7) High Point; Big South Quarterfinals	L 60-66	19–13 (13-5)	15 – Jesse Sanders	13 – Brown	6 – Jesse Sanders	Vines Center (1,965); Lynchburg, VA
*Non-conference game. ^{#}Rankings from AP Poll. (#) Tournament seedings in parentheses. All times are in Eastern Time..
