= 2010–11 UNC Asheville Bulldogs men's basketball team =

American college basketball season

2010–11 UNC Asheville Bulldogs men's basketball
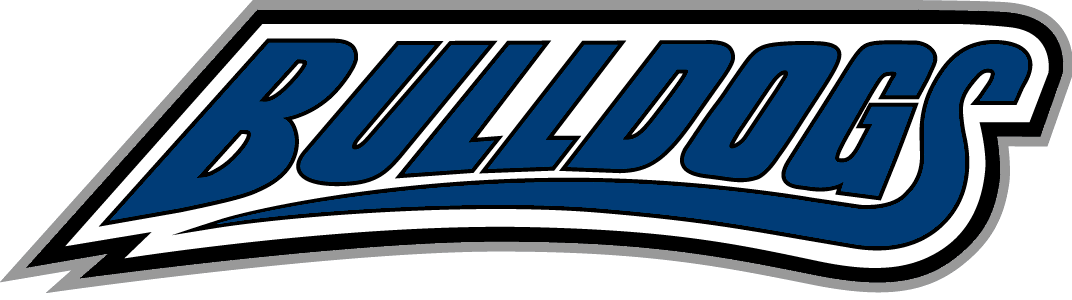

Big South tournament champions

NCAA Tournament, Round of 64
- Conference: Big South Conference
- Record: 20–14 (11–7 Big South)
- Head coach: Ed Biedenbach
- Assistant coaches: Brett Carey; Kotie Kimble; Nicholas McDevitt
- Home arena: Justice Center

2010–11 Big South men's basketball standings
| | Conf. | | | | Overall |
| Team | W | | L | PCT | W | | L | PCT |
|---|---|---|---|---|---|---|---|---|
| Coastal Carolina | 16 | – | 2 | .889 | 28 | – | 6 | .824 |
| Liberty | 13 | – | 5 | .722 | 19 | – | 13 | .594 |
| † UNC Asheville | 11 | – | 7 | .611 | 20 | – | 14 | .588 |
| VMI | 10 | – | 8 | .556 | 18 | – | 13 | .581 |
| Charleston Southern | 9 | – | 9 | .500 | 16 | – | 16 | .500 |
| Winthrop | 9 | – | 9 | .500 | 13 | – | 17 | .433 |
| High Point | 7 | – | 11 | .389 | 12 | – | 19 | .387 |
| Presbyterian | 7 | – | 11 | .389 | 13 | – | 18 | .419 |
| Gardner-Webb | 6 | – | 12 | .333 | 11 | – | 21 | .344 |
| Radford | 2 | – | 16 | .111 | 5 | – | 24 | .172 |
† 2011 Big South tournament winner As of March 16, 2011; Rankings from AP Poll

The 2010–11 UNC Asheville Bulldogs men's basketball team represented the University of North Carolina at Asheville during the 2010–11 NCAA Division I men's basketball season. The Bulldogs, led by 15th year head coach Ed Biedenbach, played their home games at the Justice Center and are members of the Big South Conference. They finished the season 20–14, 11–7 in Big South play. The Bulldogs won the 2011 Big South Conference men's basketball tournament to earn an automatic bid in the 2011 NCAA Division I men's basketball tournament. They defeated Arkansas–Little Rock in the new First Four round before falling to Pittsburgh in the second round.

== Roster ==
| Number | Name | Position | Height | Weight | Year | Hometown |
|---|---|---|---|---|---|---|
| 2 | Matt Dickey | Guard | 6–1 | 180 | Junior | Trussville, Alabama |
| 3 | J. P. Primm | Guard | 6–1 | 195 | Junior | Dickson, Tennessee |
| 4 | Chris Stephenson | Guard | 6–3 | 200 | Junior | Punta Gorda, Florida |
| 5 | Jaron Lane | Guard | 6–4 | 170 | Sophomore | Greenville, North Carolina |
| 11 | Josh Seligson | Guard | 6–2 | 170 | Freshman | Raleigh, North Carolina |
| 12 | Madison Davis | Guard | 5–10 | 160 | Sophomore | Waynesville, North Carolina |
| 20 | Chudier Pal | Center | 6–9 | 230 | Freshman | Rockingham, Western Australia |
| 23 | John Williams | Forward | 6–4 | 215 | Senior | Raleigh, North Carolina |
| 24 | Toles Hartman | Forward | 6–6 | 205 | Freshman | Christiansburg, Virginia |
| 32 | Quinard Jackson | Forward | 6–5 | 240 | Junior | West Palm Beach, Florida |
| 33 | D.J. Cunningham | Center | 6–10 | 240 | Sophomore | Waterford, Ohio |
| 35 | Jon Nwannunu | Forward | 6–8 | 225 | Sophomore | Merrillville, Indiana |
| 42 | Eric Stubbs | Center | 6–8 | 225 | Senior | West Palm Beach, Florida |
| 50 | Jeremy Harn | Forward | 6–8 | 230 | Sophomore | Chapel Hill, North Carolina |
| 55 | Trent Meyer | Guard | 6–2 | 165 | Freshman | Fort Lauderdale, Florida |

== Schedule ==
| Date time, TV | Rank^{#} | Opponent^{#} | Result | Record | Site (attendance) city, state |
Big South Conference Basketball tournament
| 3/1/11; 7:00 pm | | Charleston Southern; Quarterfinals | W 72–63 | 17–13 | Justice Center (1,015); Asheville, NC |
| 3/3/11; 6:00 pm, ESPNU | | vs. High Point; Semifinals | W 62–45 | 18–13 | Kimbel Arena (1,345); Conway, SC |
| 3/5/11; 4:00 pm, ESPN2 | | at Coastal Carolina; Championship Game | W 60–47 | 19–13 | Kimbel Arena (1,293); Conway, SC |
NCAA tournament
| 3/15/11*; 6:30 pm, truTV | | vs. Arkansas–Little Rock; First Four | W 81–77 ^{OT} | 20–13 | University of Dayton Arena (10,025); Dayton, OH |
| 3/17/11*; 3:10 pm, truTV | | vs. No. 4 Pittsburgh; Second Round | L 51–74 | 20–14 | Verizon Center (17,578); Washington, DC |
*Non-conference game. ^{#}Rankings from AP Poll. (#) Tournament seedings in parentheses. All times are in Eastern Time.
