= Eddie Biedenbach =

American basketball player and coach (born 1945)

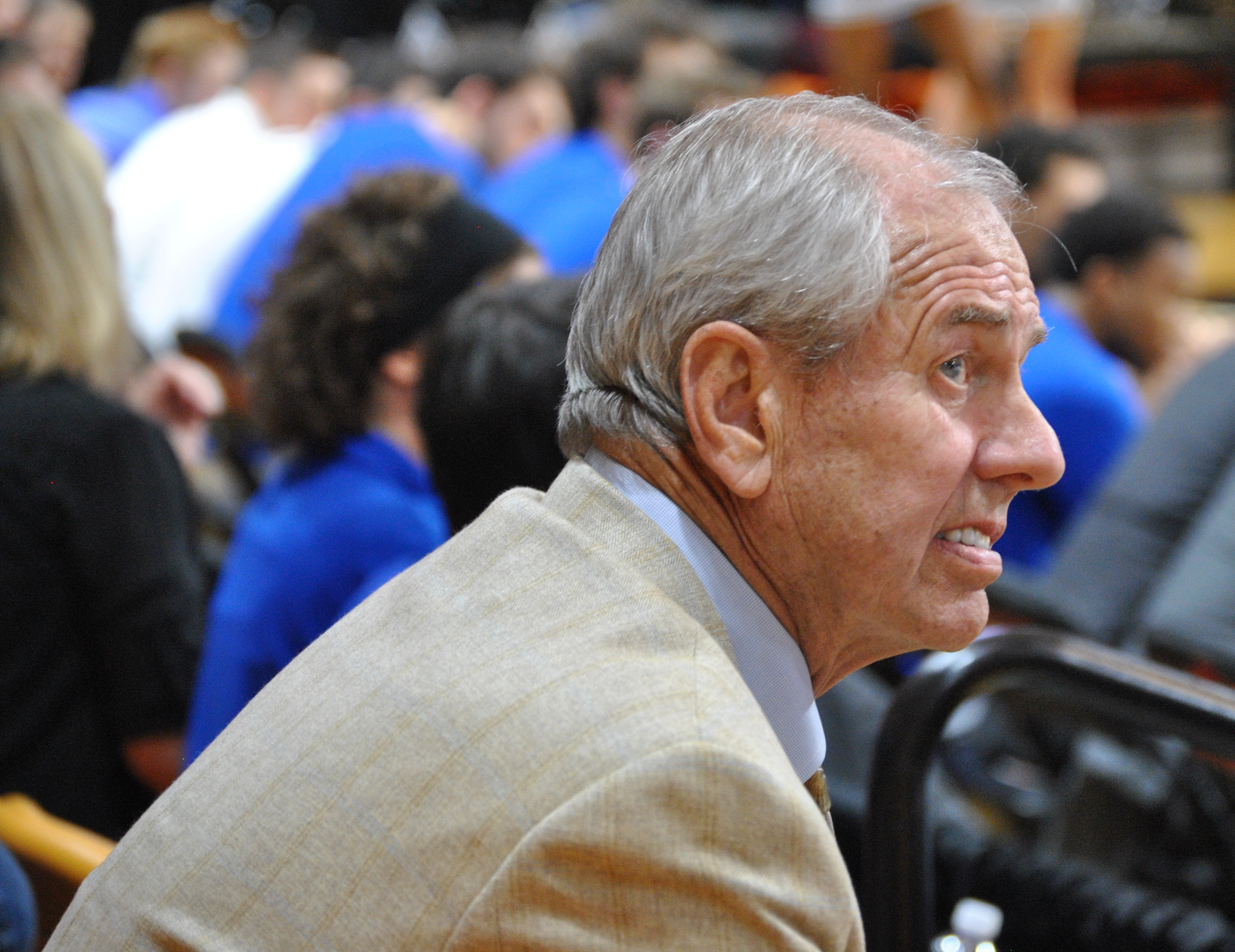
- Biedenbach in 2016

Personal information
- Born: August 12, 1945 (age 81) Pittsburgh, Pennsylvania, U.S.
- Listed height: 6 ft 1 in (1.85 m)
- Listed weight: 175 lb (79 kg)

Career information
- High school: Edgewood (Edgewood, Pennsylvania)
- College: NC State (1965–1968)
- NBA draft: 1968: 4th round, 45th overall pick
- Drafted by: Los Angeles Lakers
- Position: Guard
- Number: 12
- Coaching career: 1970–2014

Career history

Playing
- 1968: Phoenix Suns

Coaching
- 1970–1978: NC State (assistant)
- 1978–1981: Davidson
- 1981–1989: Georgia (assistant)
- 1993–1996: NC State (assistant)
- 1996–2013: UNC Asheville
- 2013–2014: UNC Wilmington (assistant)

Career highlights
- As player: 2× First-team All-ACC (1966, 1968); As coach: SoCon regular season champion (1981); 3× Big South tournament champion (2003, 2011, 2012); 5× Big South regular season champion (1997, 1998, 2002, 2008, 2012); 3× Big South Coach of the Year (1997, 2002, 2008)
- Stats at NBA.com
- Stats at Basketball Reference

Edward Joseph Biedenbach (born August 12, 1945) is an American former basketball player and college basketball coach. He played briefly in the National Basketball Association (NBA).

== Playing career ==
Born in Pittsburgh, Biedenbach attended Edgewood High School in nearby Edgewood. He played collegiately for the North Carolina State University and was selected first-team All-ACC twice.

He was selected by the St. Louis Hawks in the 9th round (106th pick overall) of the 1967 NBA draft and by the Los Angeles Lakers in the 4th round (45th pick overall) of the 1968 NBA draft. In the 1968–69 season, Biedenbach played seven games for the Phoenix Suns.

== Coaching career ==
He was an assistant coach for the 1973–74 NC State basketball team which won the NCAA championship.

Biedenbach coached at Davidson College and the University of North Carolina at Asheville. He led Asheville to three NCAA tournament appearances. In 2003, they lost to Texas in the first round.

In 2007–08, the UNC Asheville Bulldogs garnered national spotlight attention because of 7'7" center Kenny George. UNCA went 23–10 that season and was runner-up in the Big South tournament. UNCA made the NIT and lost in the first round to Ohio State 84–66.

In 2011, UNCA qualified for the NCAA tournament after winning the Big South tournament. UNCA beat Arkansas-Little Rock in the First Four before losing to Pittsburgh in the Round of 64.

The 2011–2012 season was the most successful season in Asheville basketball history. Led by four seniors (J.P. Primm, Matt Dickey, Chris Stephenson, and Quinard Jackson), the Bulldogs won a school record 24 wins. UNCA won the Big South regular season title. By virtue of winning the Big South tournament, UNCA earned a 16 seed in the NCAA tournament and led 1 seed Syracuse for the majority of the game but lost 72–65 and fell short of becoming the first 16 seed to upset a 1 seed.

On April 2, 2013, Biedenbach resigned from UNC Asheville to take an assistant coaching job under Buzz Peterson at UNC Wilmington. After Peterson was fired, Biedenbach became interim head coach until UNCW hired Kevin Keatts, who did not retain Biedenbach on staff.

== Personal life ==
Biedenbach is the father-in-law of Carolina Hurricanes head coach Rod Brind'Amour, who is married to Biedenbach's daughter, Amy.

== Career playing statistics ==
Legend
GP	Games played	GS	Games started	MPG	Minutes per game
FG%	Field goal percentage	3P%	3-point field goal percentage	FT%	Free throw percentage
RPG	Rebounds per game	APG	Assists per game	SPG	Steals per game
BPG	Blocks per game	PPG	Points per game	**Bold**	Career high

=== NBA ===
==== Regular season ====
Year	Team	GP	MPG	FG%	FT%	RPG	APG	PPG
1968–69	Phoenix	7	2.6	.000	.667	.3	.4	.6

== Head coaching record ==
Record table
Season	Team	Overall	Conference	Standing	Postseason
**Davidson Wildcats** (Southern Conference) (1978–1981)
1978–79	Davidson	8–19	3–7	6th	
1979–80	Davidson	8–18	4–11	9th	
1980–81	Davidson	13–14	11–5	1st	
Davidson:		29–51	18–23		
**UNC Asheville Bulldogs** (Big South Conference) (1996–2013)
1996–97	UNC Asheville	18–10	11–3	T–1st	
1997–98	UNC Asheville	19–9	11–1	1st	
1998–99	UNC Asheville	11–18	8–6	3rd	
1999–2000	UNC Asheville	11–19	7–7	T–3rd	
2000–01	UNC Asheville	15–13	9–5	3rd	
2001–02	UNC Asheville	13–15	10–4	T–1st	
2002–03	UNC Asheville	15–17	8–8	5th	NCAA Division I First Round
2003–04	UNC Asheville	9–20	6–10	7th	
2004–05	UNC Asheville	11–17	8–8	3rd	
2005–06	UNC Asheville	9–19	6–10	7th	
2006–07	UNC Asheville	12–19	6–8	5th	
2007–08	UNC Asheville	23–10	10–4	T–1st	NIT First Round
2008–09	UNC Asheville	15–16	10–8	4th	
2009–10	UNC Asheville	15–16	11–7	4th	
2010–11	UNC Asheville	20–14	11–7	3rd	NCAA Division I First Round
2011–12	UNC Asheville	24–10	16–2	1st	NCAA Division I First Round
2012–13	UNC Asheville	16–16	10–6	3rd (South)	
UNC Asheville:		256–258	158–104		
Total:		285–309			
National champion Postseason invitational champion Conference regular season champion Conference regular season and conference tournament champion Division regular season champion Division regular season and conference tournament champion Conference tournament champion
