= 2010–11 Coastal Carolina Chanticleers men's basketball team =

American college basketball season

2010–11 Coastal Carolina Chanticleers men's basketball

Big South Regular Season Champions

NIT, First Round
- Conference: Big South Conference
- Record: 28–6 (16–2 Big South)
- Head coach: Cliff Ellis
- Assistant coaches: Don Hogan; Gus Hauser; Richie Riley
- Home arena: Kimbel Arena

2010–11 Big South men's basketball standings
	Conf.				Overall
Team	W		L	PCT	W		L	PCT
Coastal Carolina	16	–	2	.889	28	–	6	.824
Liberty	13	–	5	.722	19	–	13	.594
† UNC Asheville	11	–	7	.611	20	–	14	.588
VMI	10	–	8	.556	18	–	13	.581
Charleston Southern	9	–	9	.500	16	–	16	.500
Winthrop	9	–	9	.500	13	–	17	.433
High Point	7	–	11	.389	12	–	19	.387
Presbyterian	7	–	11	.389	13	–	18	.419
Gardner-Webb	6	–	12	.333	11	–	21	.344
Radford	2	–	16	.111	5	–	24	.172
† 2011 Big South tournament winner As of March 16, 2011; Rankings from AP Poll

The 2010–11 Coastal Carolina Chanticleers men's basketball team represented Coastal Carolina University during the 2010–11 NCAA Division I men's basketball season. The Chanticleers, led by fourth year head coach Cliff Ellis, played their home games at Kimbel Arena and are members of the Big South Conference. They won the Big South regular season championship for the second year in a row and hosted the semi-finals and championship game of the 2011 Big South Conference men's basketball tournament. They were defeated by UNC Asheville in the tournament final. As regular season champions who failed to win their conference tournament, the Chanticleers earned an automatic bid to the 2011 National Invitation Tournament where they were defeated in the first round by Alabama. They finished the season with a record of 28–6, 16–2 in Big South play.

== Roster ==
Number	Name	Position	Height	Weight	Year	Hometown
1	Brandon Crawford	Guard/Forward	6–5	210	Junior	Montgomery, Alabama
2	Anthony Raffa	Guard	6–1	170	Sophomore	Strathmere, New Jersey
3	Danny Nieman	Guard	6–1	196	Sophomore	Concord, North Carolina
5	Sam McLaurin	Forward	6–8	230	Sophomore	Havana, Florida
11	Dexter Moore	Guard	6–1	173	Junior	Bluefield, West Virginia
15	Chris Gradnigo	Forward	6–7	223	Senior	Lake Charles, Louisiana
22	Desmond Holloway	Guard	6–3	167	Junior	Indianapolis, Indiana
23	Willie Kirkland	Guard	6–4	205	Junior	Graceville, Florida
30	Chad Gray	Forward	6–7	197	Senior	Kingstree, South Carolina
34	Jordan Griffin	Guard	6–2	191	Junior	Edgewood, Kentucky
40	Jon Pack	Center	6–11	250	Junior	Dallas, Georgia
55	Kierre Greenwood	Guard	6–2	175	Sophomore	Cincinnati, Ohio

== Schedule ==
Date time, TV	Rank^{#}	Opponent^{#}	Result	Record	Site (attendance) city, state
Regular season
11/12/10*; 7:00 pm		Piedmont	W 112–52	1–0	Kimbel Arena (814); Conway, SC
11/13/10*; 6:00 pm		LaGrange	W 79–40	2–0	Kimbel Arena (783); Conway, SC
11/16/10*; 7:00 pm		at College of Charleston	L 67–83	2–1	Carolina First Arena (3,917); Charleston, SC
11/18/10*; 12:00 pm, MASN		vs. No. 20 Georgetown; Charleston Classic first round	L 61–80	2–2	Carolina First Arena (NA); Charleston, SC
11/19/10*; 12:00 pm		vs. USC Upstate; Charleston Classic consolation game	W 71–50	3–2	Carolina First Arena; Charleston, SC
11/21/10*; 2:00 pm		vs. Charlotte; Charleston Classic 5th place game	W 79–75 ^{2OT}	4–2	Carolina First Arena (1,793); Charleston, SC
11/23/10*; 7:30 pm		North Carolina Wesleyan	W 96–56	5–2	Kimbel Arena (723); Conway, SC
11/27/10*; 7:00 pm		The Citadel	W 72–64	6–2	Kimbel Arena (832); Conway, SC
12/4/10; 2:00 pm		Charleston Southern	W 73–71	7–2 (1–0)	Kimbel Arena (988); Conway, SC
12/13/10*; 8:00 pm		at LSU	W 78–69 ^{OT}	8–2	Pete Maravich Assembly Center (7,124); Baton Rouge, LA
12/18/2010*; 12:30 pm		vs. East Carolina	W 59–58	9–2	Myrtle Beach Convention Center (2,657); Myrtle Beach, SC
12/20/10*; 7:00 pm		Thomas More	W 125–70	10–2	Kimbel Arena (875); Conway, SC
12/31/10; 2:00 pm		Radford	W 77–59	11–2 (2–0)	Kimbel Arena (1,021); Conway, SC
1/2/11; 2:00 pm		High Point	W 78–60	12–2 (3–0)	Kimbel Arena (1,113); Conway, SC
1/6/11; 7:00 pm		at VMI	W 109–87	13–2 (4–0)	Cameron Hall (1,238); Lexington, VA
1/8/11; 6:00 pm, MASN		at Liberty	W 70–67	14–2 (5–0)	Vines Center (1,471); Lynchburg, VA
1/13/11; 7:00 pm		Winthrop	W 74–69	15–2 (6–0)	Kimbel Arena (1,123); Conway, SC
1/15/11; 9:15 pm		Presbyterian	W 60–42	16–2 (7–0)	Kimbel Arena (NA); Conway, SC
1/20/11; 7:00 pm		at UNC Asheville	W 80–59	17–2 (8–0)	Justice Center (1,058); Asheville, NC
1/22/11; 7:00 pm		at Gardner–Webb	W 58–55	18–2 (9–0)	Paul Porter Arena (1,750); Boiling Springs, NC
1/27/11; 7:00 pm		at High Point	W 82–58	19–2 (10–0)	Millis Center (1,231); High Point, NC
1/29/11; 6:00 pm, MASN		at Radford	W 86–63	20–2 (11–0)	Dedmon Center (1,542); Radford, VA
2/3/11; 7:00 pm		Liberty	W 77–71	21–2 (12–0)	Kimbel Arena (1,039); Conway, SC
2/5/11; 4:30 pm		VMI	W 99–86	22–2 (13–0)	Kimbel Arena (1,039); Conway, SC
2/10/11; 7:00 pm		at Presbyterian	W 61–41	23–2 (14–0)	Templeton Physical Education Center (778); Clinton, SC
2/12/11; 7:00 pm		at Winthrop	W 61–56	24–2 (15–0)	Winthrop Coliseum (3,604); Rock Hill, SC
2/15/11; 7:00 pm		Gardner–Webb	L 57–59	24–3 (15–1)	Kimbel Arena (1,039); Conway, SC
2/17/11*; 7:00 pm		North Carolina Central	W 94–59	25–3	Kimbel Arena (1,037); Conway, SC
2/22/11; 7:00 pm, ESPN3		UNC Asheville	L 58–61	25–4 (15–2)	Kimbel Arena (1,039); Conway, SC
2/26/11; 4:30 pm		at Charleston Southern	W 81–77	26–4 (16–2)	CSU Field House (947); Charleston, SC
Big South Conference tournament
3/1/11; 7:00 pm	(1)	(8) Gardner–Webb; Quarterfinals	W 83–72	27–4	Kimbel Arena (1,266); Conway, SC
3/3/11; 6:00 pm, ESPNU	(1)	(4) VMI; Semifinals	W 89–81	28–4	Kimbel Arena (1,345); Conway, SC
3/5/11; 4:00 pm, ESPN2	(1)	(3) UNC Asheville; Championship Game	L 47–60	28–5	Kimbel Arena (1,293); Conway, SC
National Invitation Tournament
3/15/11*; 7:00 pm, ESPNU	(8 A)	at (1 A) Alabama; First Round	L 44–68	28–6	Coleman Coliseum (5,116); Tuscaloosa, AL
*Non-conference game. ^{#}Rankings from AP Poll. (#) Tournament seedings in parentheses. A=NIT Alabama Bracket. All times are in Eastern Time.
