= Anne Ross =

Anne or Ann Ross may refer to:

- Anne Ross (German singer) (born 1985)
- Anne Ross (archaeologist) (1925–2012), British archaeologist
- Ann B. Ross (fl. 1978–present), American novelist
- Anne Davidson (1937–2008), née Ross, Scottish sculptor
- Anne Ross (Australian sculptor) (born 1959)

== See also ==
- Annie Ross (1930–2020), British-American singer and actress
- Annie Ros (1926–2013), Dutch gymnast
- Krista Ann Ross (born 1967), Canadian politician
