= 2002–03 UNC Asheville Bulldogs men's basketball team =

American college basketball season

2002–03 UNC Asheville Bulldogs men's basketball
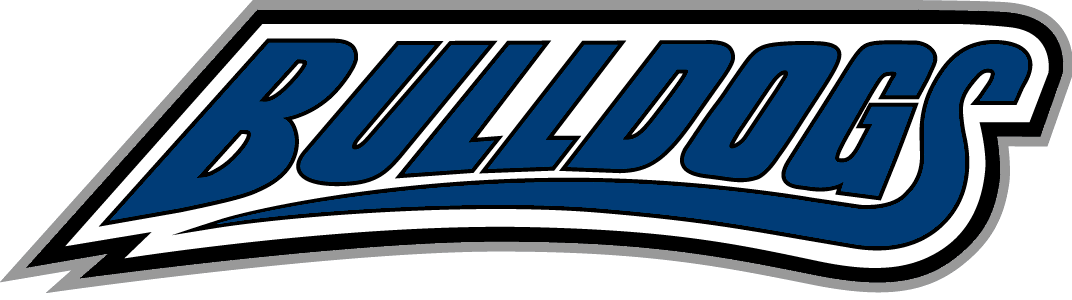

Big South tournament champions

NCAA tournament, first round
- Conference: Big South Conference
- Record: 15–17 (7–7 Big South)
- Head coach: Eddie Biedenbach
- Home arena: Justice Center

2002–03 Big South Conference men's basketball standings
	Conf.				Overall
Team	W		L	PCT	W		L	PCT
Winthrop	11	–	3	.786	20	–	10	.667
Charleston Southern	8	–	6	.571	14	–	14	.500
Liberty	8	–	6	.571	14	–	15	.483
Elon	8	–	6	.571	12	–	15	.444
UNC Asheville †	7	–	7	.500	15	–	17	.469
Radford	6	–	8	.429	10	–	20	.333
Coastal Carolina	5	–	9	.357	13	–	15	.464
High Point	3	–	11	.214	7	–	20	.259
† 2003 Big South tournament winner Rankings from AP Poll

The 2002–03 UNC Asheville Bulldogs men's basketball team represented the University of North Carolina at Asheville during the 2002–03 NCAA Division I men's basketball season. The Bulldogs, led by head coach Eddie Biedenbach, played their home games at the Justice Center and were members of the Big South Conference. They finished the season 15–17, 7–7 in Big South play to finish in fifth place. They defeated Elon, Winthrop, and Radford to become champions of the Big South tournament and receive the conference's automatic bid to the NCAA tournament – the first appearance in program history. The Bulldogs were one of two No. 16 seeds in the South region, defeating Texas Southern to reach the field of 64. UNC Asheville was eliminated in the first round by No. 1 seed and eventual Final Four participant Texas.

== Roster ==
2002–03 UNC Asheville Bulldogs men's basketball team
Players
Coaches

Pos.	#	Name	Height	Weight	Year	Hometown
G	10	Andre Smith	6 ft 2 in (1.88 m)	185 lb (84 kg)	Sr	Miami, Florida
G	11	Alex Kragel	6 ft 2 in (1.88 m)	175 lb (79 kg)	Sr	Morristown, Tennessee
F	15	Bryan McCullough	6 ft 5 in (1.96 m)	205 lb (93 kg)	So	Salisbury, North Carolina
C	41	Ben McGonagil	6 ft 11 in (2.11 m)	260 lb (118 kg)	Sr	Panama, Florida

Head coach

- Eddie Biedenbach

Assistant coach(es)

Legend

- (C) Team captain
- (S) Suspended
- (I) Ineligible
- (W) Walk-on
- Injured
- Current redshirt

Roster

== Schedule and results ==
Date time, TV	Rank^{#}	Opponent^{#}	Result	Record	Site (attendance) city, state
Regular season
Nov 22, 2002*		at No. 9 Michigan State	L 52–66	0–1	Breslin Student Events Center; East Lansing, Michigan
Nov 24, 2002*		at No. 24 Minnesota	L 81–87	0–2	Williams Arena; Minneapolis, Minnesota
Dec 7, 2002*		at East Tennessee State	L 69–87	2–3	Memorial Center; Johnson City, Tennessee
Dec 21, 2002*		at No. 8 Connecticut	L 67–117	3–4	Harry A. Gampel Pavilion; Storrs, Connecticut
Dec 22, 2002*		at Holy Cross	L 53–84	3–5	Hart Center; Worcester, Massachusetts
Dec 30, 2002*		at No. 10 Oklahoma	L 64–100	3–6	Lloyd Noble Center; Norman, Oklahoma
Jan 2, 2003*		at No. 18 Kansas	L 50–102	3–7	Allen Fieldhouse; Lawrence, Kansas
Mar 1, 2003		Winthrop	L 65–76	11–16 (7–7)	Justice Center; Asheville, North Carolina
Big South tournament
Mar 4, 2003*		at Elon; Quarterfinals	W 68–66 ^{OT}	12–16	Alumni Gym; Elon, North Carolina
Mar 7, 2003*		vs. Winthrop; Semifinals	W 81–80 ^{OT}	13–16	Vines Center; Lynchburg, Virginia
Mar 8, 2003*		vs. Radford; Championship game	W 85–71	14–16	Vines Center; Lynchburg, Virginia
NCAA tournament
Mar 18, 2003*	(16 S)	vs. (16 S) Texas Southern; Play-in game	W 92–84 ^{OT}	15–16	University of Dayton Arena; Dayton, Ohio
Mar 21, 2003*	(16 W)	vs. (1 S) No. 5 Texas; First round	L 61–82	15–17	BJCC Arena; Birmingham, Alabama
*Non-conference game. ^{#}Rankings from AP Poll. (#) Tournament seedings in parentheses. S=South Region. All times are in Eastern Time.
