= Christopher Oakley =

Christopher Oakley may refer to:

- Christopher Oakley (animator), American artist and animator
- Christopher Oakley (historian), American historian
