= Tom Smith (UNC Asheville baseball coach) =

Playing career
- 1973–1974: Western Carolina

Coaching career (HC unless noted)
- 1978–2006: Asheville (NC) Roberson
- 2008–2009: UNC Asheville (Asst.)
- 2010–2014: UNC Asheville

Head coaching record
- Overall: 86–177
- Tournaments: Big South: 0–2

Tom Smith is an American college baseball coach, formerly the head coach of the UNC Asheville Bulldogs baseball team. He retired from that position following the 2014 season after holding it for five years.

Smith played at Western Carolina, where he earned a pair of varsity letters. After completing his degree at Western in 1978, he became head coach at T. C. Roberson High School, where he led the Rams to three state championships, fourteen conference titles, and saw 20 players drafted in the Major League Baseball draft. Roberson established itself as one of the top programs in the state during his 28 years as head coach, and Smith collected a record of 478–185. He retired after the 2006 season in order to watch his son, Kenny, play his final collegiate season at Western Carolina, after transferring from UNC Wilmington. A year later, Smith became an assistant at UNC Asheville, and two years after that he was elevated to head coach. Kenny is now an assistant at High Point.

== Head coaching record ==
Record table
Season	Team	Overall	Conference	Standing	Postseason
UNC Asheville Bulldogs (Big South Conference) (2010–2014)
2010	UNC Asheville	17–35	10–17	T-7th (10)	
2011	UNC Asheville	15–37	7–20	10th (10)	
2012	UNC Asheville	25–30	12–12	T-4th (11)	Big South Tournament (Note: The top eight finishers of the Big South's eleven teams qualified for the Tournament in 2012.)
2013	UNC Asheville	16–35	4–18	6th (South) (6)	
2014	UNC Asheville	13–40	4–22	6th (South) (6)	
UNC Asheville:		86–177	37–89		
Total:		86–177			
National champion Postseason invitational champion Conference regular season champion Conference regular season and conference tournament champion Division regular season champion Division regular season and conference tournament champion Conference tournament champion
