= 2003 Big South Conference men's basketball tournament =

- Classification: Division I
- Season: 2002–03
- Teams: 8
- Site: Campus sites
- Finals site: Vines Center; Lynchburg, VA
- Champions: UNC Asheville (2nd title)
- Winning coach: Eddie Biedenbach (1st title)
- MVP: Andre Smith (UNC Asheville)

2002–03 Big South Conference men's basketball standings
	Conf.				Overall
Team	W		L	PCT	W		L	PCT
Winthrop	11	–	3	.786	20	–	10	.667
Charleston Southern	8	–	6	.571	14	–	14	.500
Liberty	8	–	6	.571	14	–	15	.483
Elon	8	–	6	.571	12	–	15	.444
UNC Asheville †	7	–	7	.500	15	–	17	.469
Radford	6	–	8	.429	10	–	20	.333
Coastal Carolina	5	–	9	.357	13	–	15	.464
High Point	3	–	11	.214	7	–	20	.259
† 2003 Big South tournament winner Rankings from AP Poll

The 2003 Big South Conference men's basketball tournament took place March 4–8, 2003, at campus sites. The tournament was won by the UNC Asheville Bulldogs, their second tournament championship, and first under head coach Eddie Biedenbach.

== Format ==
All eight teams participated in the tournament. Teams were seeded by conference winning percentage. For the quarterfinals, all games were hosted at campus sites, with home-field advantage going to the higher seed, while the semifinals and finals were played at the Vines Center in Lynchburg, Virginia, the home of Liberty University. This was the last year for Elon as a member of the Big South.

== Bracket ==
Quarterfinals; March 4
1	Winthrop	80
8	High Point	64
4	Elon	66
5	UNC Asheville	68
2	Liberty	63
7	Coastal Carolina	61
3	Charleston Southern	62
6	Radford	65

Semifinals; March 7
1	Winthrop	80
5	UNC Asheville	81
2	Liberty	52
6	Radford	55

Finals; March 8
5	UNC Asheville	85
6	Radford	71

* Asterisk indicates overtime game

== All-Tournament Team ==
- Andre Smith, UNC Asheville
- Alex Kragel, UNC Asheville
- Ryan McCullough, UNC Asheville
- Ben McGonagil, UNC Asheville
- Raymond Arrington, Radford
