= Hands in Harmony =

Hands in Harmony: Traditional Crafts and Music in Appalachia
- First edition cover
- Author: Timothy Lee Barnwell
- Language: English
- Genre: Photography
- Published: 2009 W.W. Norton
- Publication place: United States
- Pages: 192 (First Edition)
- ISBN: 978-0-393-06815-3

Hands in Harmony: Traditional Crafts and Music in Appalachia is a 2009 photography book by photographer and author Timothy Lee Barnwell. It was first published on October 12, 2009 by W.W. Norton and, like Barnwell's prior works, focuses on the culture and history of Appalachia. Its contents focus on the traditions of hand crafts and on old-time and bluegrass music, and it contains photographs of Barnwell's interviewees as well as an accompanying CD of bluegrass music.

== Synopsis ==
The book explores the history of folk music and traditional handcrafts, and includes interviews with the musicians and craftsmen who appear in it. Accompanying the interviews are eighty black-and-white photographs that show the craftsmen in their trade and musicians performing and in their homes.

== Reception ==
Critical reception for Hands in Harmony has been positive. Mother Jones cited the book's accompanying CD as a highlight of the work. The book has also received praise from media outlets such as Our State and Bluegrass Unlimited Magazine, with Our State praising Barnwell's photography.
