= 2011 Big South Conference men's basketball tournament =

- 2011 Big South Championship logo
- Classification: Division I
- Season: 2010–11
- Teams: 8
- Site: campus sites
- Champions: UNC Asheville Bulldogs (3rd title)
- Winning coach: Ed Biedenbach (2nd title)

2010–11 Big South men's basketball standings
	Conf.				Overall
Team	W		L	PCT	W		L	PCT
Coastal Carolina	16	–	2	.889	28	–	6	.824
Liberty	13	–	5	.722	19	–	13	.594
† UNC Asheville	11	–	7	.611	20	–	14	.588
VMI	10	–	8	.556	18	–	13	.581
Charleston Southern	9	–	9	.500	16	–	16	.500
Winthrop	9	–	9	.500	13	–	17	.433
High Point	7	–	11	.389	12	–	19	.387
Presbyterian	7	–	11	.389	13	–	18	.419
Gardner-Webb	6	–	12	.333	11	–	21	.344
Radford	2	–	16	.111	5	–	24	.172
† 2011 Big South tournament winner As of March 16, 2011; Rankings from AP Poll

The 2011 Big South men's basketball tournament took place on March 1, 3, and 5, 2011, at campus sites. The semifinal round was televised on ESPNU, and the finals were televised on ESPN2. The UNC Asheville Bulldogs won the tournament, defeating Charleston Southern 72–63 in the quarterfinal round, High Point 62–45 in the semifinal round, and #1 Coastal Carolina 60–47 in the championship game.

== Format ==
The top eight eligible men's basketball teams in the Big South Conference received a berth in the conference tournament. After the 18 game conference season, teams were seeded by conference record. The winner received an automatic bid to the NCAA tournament, and UNC Asheville received that bid in 2011 as they won the tournament.

Presbyterian was not eligible to compete in the 2011 tournament due to reclassification.

== Bracket ==
Quarterfinals; March 1
1	Coastal Carolina	83
8	Gardner–Webb	72
4	VMI	78
5	Winthrop	73
3	UNC Asheville	72
6	Charleston Southern	63
2	Liberty	60
7	High Point	66

Semifinals; March 3
1	Coastal Carolina	89
4	VMI	81
3	UNC Asheville	62
7	High Point	45

Finals; March 5
1	Coastal Carolina	47
3	UNC Asheville	60

- asterisk indicates overtime game
