= The Face of Appalachia =

The Face of Appalachia: Portraits from the Mountain Farm
- First edition cover
- Author: Timothy Lee Barnwell
- Language: English
- Genre: Photography
- Published: 2003 W.W. Norton
- Publication place: United States
- Pages: 158 (First Edition)
- ISBN: 0-393-05787-9

The Face of Appalachia: Portraits from the Mountain Farm is a 2003 hardcover book by photographer and author Timothy Lee Barnwell. It is a mixture of photography and oral history text about the culture of Appalachia. It was first published on December 17, 2003 W.W. Norton and includes over 100 black and white photographs as well as interviews with the Appalachia inhabitants depicted.

== Synopsis ==
The book presents photos and interviews taken over a 25-year period. Photographs cover elements of Appalachia life such as farming, hunting, community and religious activities. Material is compiled into eight chapters, each of which focuses on specific things associated with the community and with Appalachian life.

== Reception ==
Critical reception for The Face of Appalachia has been positive. Black and White Magazine and The New York Times both gave positive reviews of the book, with The New York Times noting that the work was "a notable work of anthropology."
