= Matt Dickey =

American basketball player (born 1989)

Personal information
- Born: November 18, 1989 (age 36) East Ridge, Tennessee, U.S.
- Listed height: 6 ft 1 in (1.85 m)
- Listed weight: 180 lb (82 kg)

Career information
- High school: Hewitt-Trussville (Trussville, Alabama)
- College: UNC Asheville (2008–2012)
- NBA draft: 2012: undrafted
- Playing career: 2012–2013
- Position: Point guard

Career history
- 2013: Texas Legends
- 2013: Los Angeles D-Fenders

Career highlights
- Big South Player of the Year (2012); AP Honorable Mention All-American (2012); 2× First-team All-Big South (2011, 2012)

Matthew Dickey (born November 18, 1989) is an American basketball player who is best known for his collegiate career at the University of North Carolina at Asheville (UNC Asheville). A 6'1" point guard, Dickey guided the Bulldogs to consecutive NCAA Tournament berths in 2011 and 2012. As a senior in 2011–12 he was named the Big South Conference's Player of the Year; he led the team with a 16.1 points per game average en route to conference regular season and conference tournament championships. UNC Asheville set a school record with 24 wins that year.

== College career ==
Lightly recruited out of Hewitt-Trussville High School in Trussville, Alabama, Dickey only received scholarship offers from Belmont, Morehead State, Wofford, and UNC Asheville. After accepting the scholarship to UNC Asheville, Dickey contributed right away by averaging 10.9 points per game during his freshman season.

Over the course of Dickey's college career he would go on to increase his scoring average each season. His coach, Eddie Biedenbach, credited his hard work for the improvement. By the time Dickey was a senior he averaged a team-leading 16.1 points per game and guided them to their second straight NCAA Tournament appearance. In the 2012 tournament, UNC Asheville came extremely close to becoming the first team in history to win as a #16-seed after losing to #1-seed Syracuse 72 to 65. That game was the last of Dickey's collegiate career. He finished with 1,778 points, which is a school record for career points in their Division I era.

== Professional career ==
Dickey went undrafted in the 2012 NBA draft. On November 2, 2012, he was drafted in the 3rd round of the 2012 NBA D-League Draft by the Rio Grande Valley Vipers. However, he was waived on November 21. On January 12, 2013, he was acquired by the Texas Legends. On January 29, he was waived by the Legends after playing in 6 games. On April 4, 2013, he was acquired by the Los Angeles D-Fenders.

=== The Basketball Tournament ===
In 2017, Dickey played for The CITI Team of The Basketball Tournament. The Basketball Tournament is an annual $2 million winner-take-all tournament broadcast on ESPN.

== Outside of basketball ==
In May 2013, shortly after the D-League season ended, Dickey traveled to Honduras with Crossfire Ministries. It inspired him to possibly head to seminary school and become a full-time minister. He coached at Westbrook Christian School located in Rainbow City, Alabama. He is now a student minister at First Baptist Church Trussville.
