= Timothy Lee Barnwell =

American photographer (born 1955)

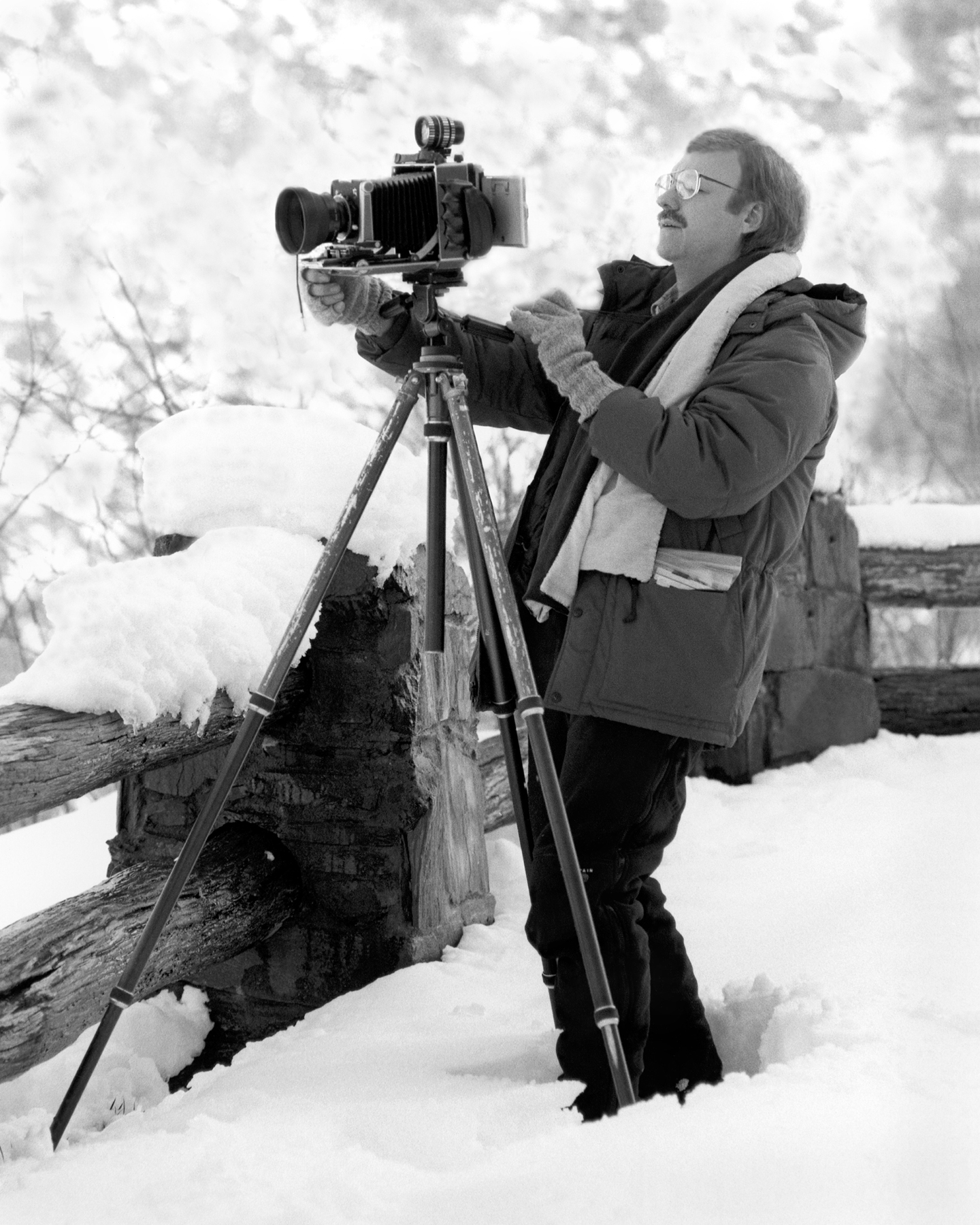
- Tim Barnwell with 4x5 view camera in the field.
- Born: February 17, 1955 (age 71); Bryson City NC, U.S.
- Education: University of North Carolina at Asheville (BA)
- Scientific career
- Fields: Documentary photography, Fine-art photography, Commercial photography

Timothy Lee Barnwell (born 1955) is an American author, commercial photographer, fine art photographer and filmmaker based in Asheville, NC. His photojournalistic work has been published in dozens of publications including Time, Newsweek, Mother Jones, Billboard, LensWork, National Parks, American Craft, Outdoor Photographer, Blue Ridge Country, Our State, Smoky Mountain Living, Ceramics Monthly, American Craft, Aperture, and B & W magazine. LensWork, a photographic magazine, ran cover stories on two portfolios of his work; "Appalachian Home" with interview in Issue #76 / May–June 2008 and "Jewels of the Southern Coast" in Issue 126 / September–October 2016.

In 1981 he founded Appalachian Photographic Workshops and served as Director and photography instructor until it closed in 1988. As director he designed, coordinated, and taught year-round workshops with staff and visiting master photographers including Cole Weston, Ernst Hass, George Tice, Galen Rowell, Freeman Patterson, Jerry Uelsmann, Robert Farber, John Shaw, Sonja Bullaty, Angelo Lomeo, Ken Marcus, John Sexton, Nancy Brown, Art Wolfe, Steve Krongard, E. Alan McGee, Dean Conger, and Carson Graves. Since 1988 he has worked as a commercial and fine art photographer, taught photography classes, produced eight books, and worked as a documentary filmmaker.

Mr. Barnwell has filmed over 40 documentary episodes for the YouTube channel, The Face of Appalachia, coproducing the resulting films with long-time associate Scott Allen. Subject matter ranges from Appalachian history and culture, to river baptisms, homecomings, farming practices, molasses making, the impact of Hurricane Helene on communities, traditional music and crafts in Appalachia, and personal profiles.

He has been principal or contributing photographer to dozens of books and is the author of eight of his own including, The Face of Appalachia: Portraits from the Mountain Farm (W.W. Norton/NY, 2003 and reprinted as new, 2nd edition by Numinous Editions, 2021); On Earth's Furrowed Brow: The Appalachian Farm in Photographs (W.W. Norton/NY, 2007); Hands in Harmony: Traditional Crafts and Music in Appalachia (W.W. Norton/NY, 2009); Blue Ridge Parkway Vistas: A Comprehensive Identification Guide to What You See From the Many Overlooks (Numinous Editions, 2014, Third Edition released 2024), Great Smoky Mountains Vistas: A Guide, with Mountain Peak Identifications, for What to See and Do In and Around the National Park (Numinous Editions, 2016), Faces & Places of Cashiers Valley (Cashiers Historical Society, 2019, Second edition released 2024), Tide Runners: Shrimping and Fishing on the Carolinas and Georgia Coast (Numinous Editions, 2019), and Jewels of the Southern Coast: Architectural Gems of Charleston, Savannah and Beyond (Numinous Editions, 2022).

An amateur astronomer, he is one of the founding members of the Astronomy Club of Asheville. Mr. Barnwell served as club president for many years and has had images published in Sky & Telescope and Astronomy magazines.

He is an Honorary Member of the Southern Highland Craft Guild and member of the Southern Independent Booksellers Alliance.

== Bibliography ==
- The Face of Appalachia: Portraits from the Mountain Farm (2003)
- On Earth's Furrowed Brow: The Appalachian Farm in Photographs (2007)
- Hands in Harmony: Portraits from the Mountain Farm (2009)
- Blue Ridge Parkway Vistas: A Comprehensive Identification Guide To What You See from the Many Overlooks (2014)
- Great Smoky Mountains Vistas: A Guide, with Mountain Peak Identifications, for What to See and Do In and Around the National Park (2016)
- Faces & Places of Cashiers Valley (2019)
- Tide Runners: Shrimping and Fishing on the Carolinas and Georgia Coast (2019)
- Jewels of the Southern Coast: Architectural Gems of Charleston, Savannah and Beyond (2022)

== Exhibitions ==
Barnwell's photography has been included in over 65 exhibits since 1977, including three one-man shows in New York City's SOHO Photo Gallery. His work is included in the permanent collections of numerous museums such as the Metropolitan Museum of Art, the Asheville Art Museum, the Newark Museum of Art, the Greenville (SC) County Museum of Art, New Orleans Museum of Art, Mint Museum (Charlotte NC), Booth Western Art Museum, and the High Museum. His fine artwork is represented by the Lumiere gallery in Atlanta, GA.
