= Ann B. Ross =

American novelist

- Born: January 28, 1934; Austell, Georgia, U.S.
- Died: April 16, 2025 (aged 91); Hendersonville, North Carolina, U.S.
- Education: University of North Carolina at Asheville (BA); University of North Carolina at Chapel Hill (MA, PhD)
- Occupations: author and professor
- Writing career
- Genres: Cozy mystery, mystery
- Website: www.missjulia.com

Ann B. Ross (January 28, 1934 – April 16, 2025) was an American author and college professor. She is known for the New York Times bestsellers cozy mystery series, Miss Julia, that was set in her home state of North Carolina. Ross also taught literature and humanities at the University of North Carolina at Asheville.

== Early life ==
Ross was born January 28, 1934 in Austell, Georgia. Her parents were Roy Parker Brown and Annie Lola Brown.

Ross attended Blue Ridge Community College. She then attended nursing school at Armstrong College and worked as a nurse at the OR Department of South Carolina Baptist Hospital in Columbia, South Carolina.

Ross returned to college in 1980, graduating Magna cum Laude with a B.A. in literature at the University of North Carolina at Asheville in 1984, while her children were also at university. She earned an MA in 1986 and Ph.D. in 1992, both in Medieval Studies from the University of North Carolina at Chapel Hill.

== Career ==
Ross began her publishing career with two paperback murder mysteries: The Murder Cure published in 1978 and The Murder Stroke published in 1981. They "didn't do very well" and she gave up on writing. While a graduate student, she wrote The Pilgrimage, an adventure story about two North Carolina sisters who go west in the 19th–century as missionaries. Doris Betts, a novelist and creative writing professor at UNC, put Ross in touch with agent Rhoda Weyr, who read The Pilgrimage and sold it to MacMillan Press in 1988. However, sales were again limited.

After 1991, Ross transitioned to a career as visiting professor and adjuect professor of literature at the University of North Carolina at Asheville. At this time, she created the character Miss Julia. Ross said, “For the first time in my life, I was no one’s daughter, niece, wife, or mother. I was just Ann, and my identity came from my classroom performance alone. ...It was absolutely liberating.” The fictional Miss Julia (aka Mrs. Wesley Lloyd Springer), is "a refined Southern woman" whose life is disrupted by the secrets of her deceased husband. Ross writes from Miss Julia's perspective.

Despite the prediction of an editor at William Morrow "that her audience would be limited to women over forty in the Southeastern United States," the first book in the series, Miss Julia Speaks Her Mind, sold well and went through six printings its first year. The Independent Booksellers Association ranked number nine on its list of recommended books for the year. It also was named to the Barnes & Noble Discover Great New Writers list." Reader's Digest Condensed Books issued the book in twelve different languages."

The novels' plots often depend on points of North Carolina state law to do, for example, with inheritance, mental competence, and a mother's fitness to care for her child (as in Miss Julia Speaks Her Mind and Miss Julia Takes Over). One of the common themes in the series is hypocrisy among the clergy.

The Miss Julia series is popular among book clubs in the United States and is also successful in Germany, Japan, and Poland. Ross is particularly proud of a fan letter from Dolly Parton. In 2017 Miss Julia Inherits a Mess was nominated for a Southern Book Prize by the Southern Independent Booksellers Association.

When Ross wrote Miss Julia Goes Rogue featuring the same character as a brutal and sexy vampire, "Ross’ publisher, unwilling to upset the original Miss Julia brand, refused to green-light the project." Journalists at a newspaper in western North Carolina included Ross along with Woody Harrelson, Christo and Jeanne-Claude, and Gladys Knight in a spoof of crowd-sourced funding campaigns to get this novel published.

In 2021, Ross ended the 22-volume series with Miss Julia Happily Ever After.“ Ross said, "As I wrote Happily Ever After, a series of changes in my personal and professional lives were converging in such a way that I began to feel that somebody was trying to tell me something. Miss Julia and the ones she loves are in a good place right now, nothing that needs to be wrapped up is pending, most questions have been answered, no one is languishing in jail [and] everybody is home where they’re supposed to be, so it all felt like a good place to just let go.”

In 2021, Columbia Tri-Star Productions optioned Miss Julia Speaks Her Mind to be independently produced as either a film or television series.

== Personal life ==
Ross met her future husband at South Carolina Baptist Hospital, where she was a nurse and he was a resident. She married Dr. John Marion Ross on December 24, 1953. The couple then moved to Charleston, South Carolina. The couple had two daughters and one son.

In 1963, they moved to Hendersonville, North Carolina where her husband had a private practice. There, Ross was involved in First Presbyterian Church and was active in the Junior Welface Club. Until 1977, the family lived in a historical house built in 1836 that inspired Miss Julia's house.Hendersonville was the basis for the town in the Miss Julia books.

In 2010, the University of North Carolina at Asheville honored her as a Distinguished Alumna for her career as a novelist.

She died April 16, 2025 at her home in Hendersonville, North Carolina.

== Publications ==
=== Novels ===
- The Murder Cure (Avon Books, 1978) ISBN 9780380409150
- The Murder Stroke (Nordon Publications, 1981) ISBN 9780843980189
- The Pilgrimage (Macmillan Publishing Company, 1987) ISBN 9780026051408
- Miss Julia Speaks Her Mind (William Morrow, 1999) ISBN 9780688167882
- Miss Julia Takes Over (Viking, 2001) ISBN 9780670910267
- Miss Julia Throws a Wedding (Viking, 2002) ISBN 9780670031054
- Miss Julia Hits the Road (Viking, 2003) ISBN 9780739434116
- Miss Julia Meets Her Match (Viking, 2004) ISBN 9780670032938
- Miss Julia's School of Beauty (Viking, 2005) ISBN 9780670033881
- Miss Julia Stands Her Ground (Viking, 2006) ISBN 9780670034925
- Miss Julia Strikes Back (Viking, 2007) ISBN 9780670038411
- Miss Julia Paints the Town (Viking, 2008) ISBN 9780670018642
- Miss Julia Delivers the Goods (Viking, 2009) ISBN 9780670020652
- Miss Julia Renews Her Vows (Viking, 2010) ISBN 9780670021550
- Miss Julia Rocks the Cradle (Viking, 2011) ISBN 9780670022557
- Miss Julia to the Rescue (Viking, 2012) ISBN 9780670023387
- Miss Julia Stirs Up Trouble (2013) ISBN 9780670026104
- Miss Julia's Marvelous Makeover (Viking, 2014) ISBN 9780670026111
- Etta Mae's Worst Bad–Luck Day (Viking, 2014) ISBN 9780670024377
- Miss Julia Lays Down the Law (Viking, 2015) ISBN 9780525427094
- Miss Julia Inherits a Mess (Viking, 2016) ISBN 9780525427124
- Miss Julia Weathers the Storm (Viking, 2017) ISBN 9780735220478
- Miss Julia Raises the Roof (Viking, 2018) ISBN 9780735220508
- Miss Julia Takes the Wheel (Viking, 2019) ISBN 9780525560487
- Miss Julia Knows a Thing or Two (Viking, 2020) ISBN 9780525560517
- Miss Julia Happily Ever After (Viking, 2021) ISBN 9780593296462

=== Novelette ===
- Miss Julia's Gift (Viking, 2013) ISBN 9781101633694
