= Southern Virginia Knights men's basketball =

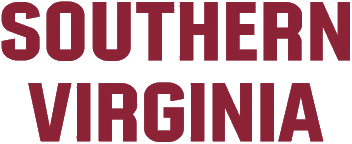
- University: Southern Virginia University
- Athletic director: Josh Monsen
- Head coach: Trace Bevell (3rd season)
- Location: Buena Vista, Virginia
- Arena: Knight Sports Arena (capacity: 525)
- Conference: USA South Athletic Conference
- Nickname: Knights
- Colors: Crimson and White
- All-time record: 109–198 (.355)

The Southern Virginia Knights men's basketball team is an NCAA Division III college basketball team competing in the USA South Athletic Conference. Home games are played at the Knight Sports Arena, located on the Southern Virginia University's campus in Buena Vista.

The team is currently coached by Trace Bevell, hired on August 8, 2023.

== History ==
=== Classifications ===
Classifications
Year	Division
1998–99 to 2012–13:	USCAA
2013–14 to present:	NCAA Division III

=== Conference Memberships ===
Conference Memberships
Year	Conference
1998–99 to 2012–13:	USCAA Independent
2013–14 to 2020–21:	Capital Athletic Conference (Note: Currently known as the Coast to Coast Athletic Conference.)
2021–22 to present	USA South Athletic Conference

== Season-by-Season Results ==
=== USCAA ===
Season	Coach	Overall	Conference	Standing	Postseason
USCAA Independent
1998–99		11-15		3rd of 14	USCAA 2nd Place
1999–2000		4-27		—	—
2000–01	Don Chamberlain	12-16		—	—
2001–02	Don Chamberlain	9-16		—	—
2002–03	Don Chamberlain	6-24		—	—
2003–04	Don Chamberlain	13-15		—	—
2004–05	Don Chamberlain	16-18		—	—
2005–06	Don Chamberlain	11-19		—	—
2006–07	Charles Jolley	12-19		—	—
2007–08	Charles Jolley	13-14		—	—
2008–09	Brian Pendleton	17-12	2-2	—	USCAA Division I Final Four
2009–10	Brian Pendleton	16-9	6-2	—	USCAA Division I National Runner-Up
2010–11	Brian Pendleton	24-8	5-0	—	USCAA Division I National Champions
2011–12	Brian Pendleton	16-11	7-2	—	USCAA Division I First Round
2012–13	Tony Caputo	17-7	12-2	—	USCAA Division I Final Four
Totals	15 Years ? Coaches	?–?	?–?	0 Conf. Championships	0 Appearances

=== NCAA Division III ===
Southern Virginia records season by season since joining Division III in 2013.

Season	Coach	Overall	Conference	Standing	Postseason
Capital Athletic Conference
2013–14	Tony Caputo	6–16	Not eligible	—	—
2014–15	Tony Caputo	6–19	4–14	T–8th of 10	—
2015–16	Tony Caputo	9–17	8–10	T–4th of 10	—
2016–17	Tony Caputo	5–20	3–15	10th of 10	—
2017–18	Tony Caputo	11–14	6–12	8th of 10	—
2018–19	Greg Winslow	4–22	0–14	8th of 8	—
2019–20	Adam Wardenburg	1–25	0–10	6th of 6	—
2020–21	Adam Wardenburg	— (Note: Season canceled due to the COVID-19 pandemic.)	—	—	—
USA South Athletic Conference
2021–22	Adam Wardenburg	14–12	8–6	4th of 8 East	—
2022–23	Adam Wardenburg	13–14	5–9	T–5th of 8	—
2023–24	Trace Bevell	6–19	3–11	T–7th of 8	—
2024–25	Trace Bevell	19–8	9–5	3rd of 8	—
2025–26	Trace Bevell	15–12	10–4	3rd of 8	—
Totals	12 Years; 3 Coaches	109–198	56–110	0 Conf. Championships	0 Appearances
