= Kenny George =

American retired basketball player (born 1986)

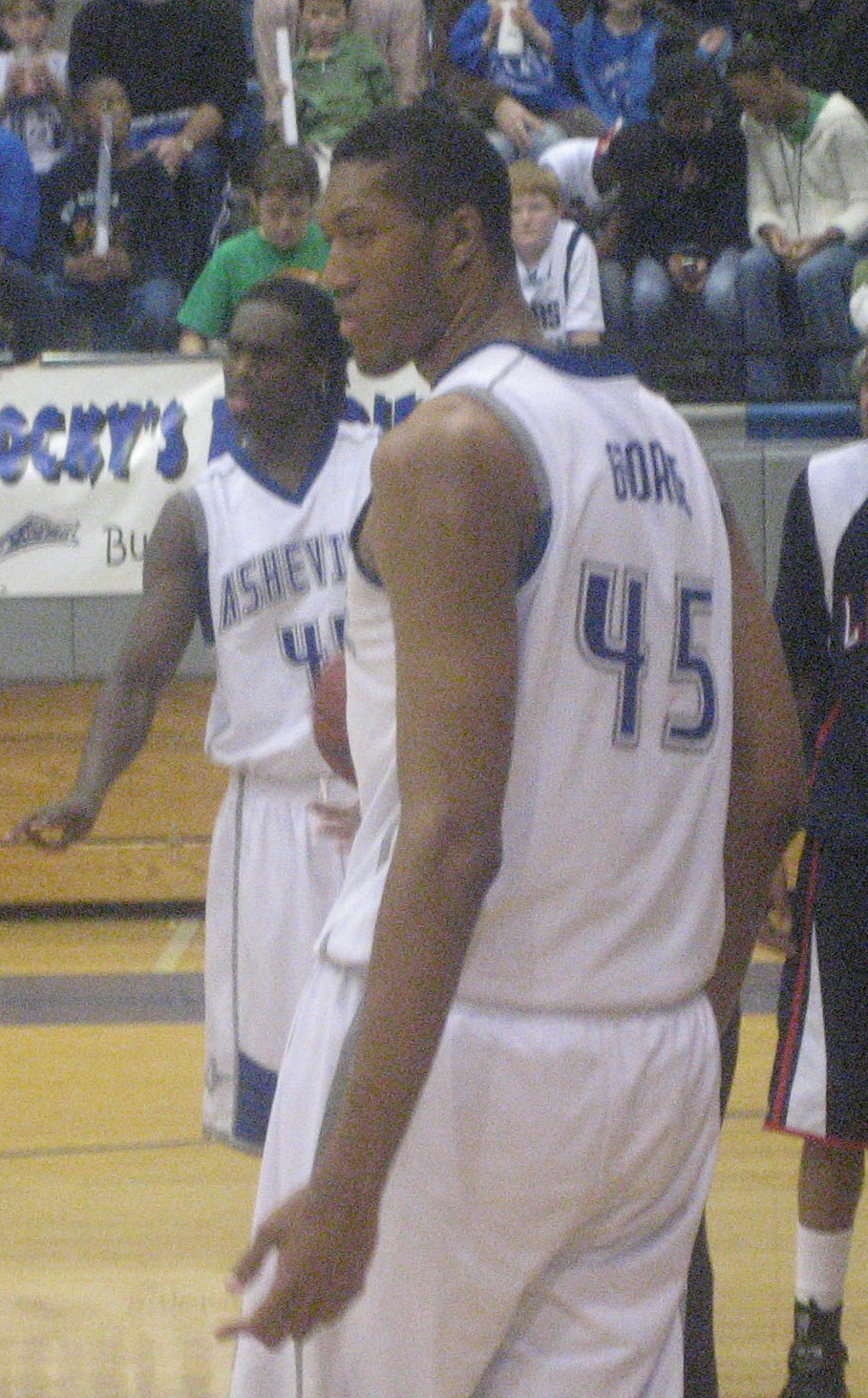
- George with the UNC Asheville Bulldogs in 2007

Personal information
- Born: c. 1986 (age 39–40) Chicago, Illinois, U.S.
- Listed height: 7 ft 7 in (2.31 m)
- Listed weight: 370 lb (168 kg)

Career information
- High school: Latin School of Chicago (Chicago, Illinois)
- College: UNC Asheville (2006–2008)
- NBA draft: 2010: undrafted
- Position: Center

Career highlights
- Second-team All-Big South (2008); Big South Defensive Player of the Year (2008)

Kenneth George Jr. (born c. 1986) is an American former college basketball player. Listed at 7 ft 7 in (2.31 m), he was the tallest basketball player in the United States during the two years he played for the UNC Asheville Bulldogs. George and Mike Lanier of the UCLA Bruins were the tallest players in the history of college basketball until they were surpassed in 2024-2025 by Olivier Rioux of the Florida Gators at 7 ft 9 in (2.36 m).

== Early life and education ==
George was raised on the north side of Chicago, Illinois. His parents separated when he was 2 and he was raised by his father, Ken Sr.

At the age of 15, he had an overactive pituitary gland issue that caused him to grow to a height of 6’11” by his sophomore year at Latin School of Chicago.

== College career ==
George was academically ineligible for his first season with the UNC Asheville Bulldogs and missed his second season after he dislocated a knee during preseason.

George played for the Bulldogs from 2006 to 2008. He was listed as 7 ft 7 in (2.31 m) but reached 7 ft 9 in (2.36 m) with shoes. George was selected as the Big South Conference Defensive Player of the Year and earned second-team all-Big South honors in 2008.

== Career statistics ==
Legend
GP	Games played	GS	Games started	MPG	Minutes per game
FG%	Field goal percentage	3P%	3-point field goal percentage	FT%	Free throw percentage
RPG	Rebounds per game	APG	Assists per game	SPG	Steals per game
BPG	Blocks per game	PPG	Points per game	**Bold**	Career high

=== College ===
Year	Team	GP	GS	MPG	FG%	3P%	FT%	RPG	APG	SPG	BPG	PPG
2006–07	UNC Asheville	23	0	10.5	.772	.000	.235	3.5	0.5	0.0	2.0	5.5
2007–08	UNC Asheville	28	0	19.8	.696	.000	.652	7.0	1.1	0.1	3.3	12.4
Career		51	0	15.2	.734	.000	.460	5.3	0.8	0.0	2.7	9.0

== Personal life ==
In October 2008, George had his right foot partly amputated due to a Methicillin-resistant Staphylococcus aureus (MRSA) infection. After this, he had to rely on a larger custom wheelchair for mobility, and began advocating for better public transport accessibility in North Carolina.
