= Christopher Oakley (animator) =

American animator

Christopher Oakley is an American artist and animator.

== Biography ==
Oakley was born in Illinois in a family of artists and models. His father worked in Chicago as a vocational art director and set designer. At age 11 he painted his first picture and continued it throughout high school. He graduated from Columbia University with a degree in stop-motion animation. He made a lot of television commercials and was also behind two seasons of Pee-wee's Playhouse cartoons. In the 1990s he was hired by Walt Disney Feature Animation where he spent four years creating the 2000 film Dinosaur. There, he also helped design Genie from Aladdin to be put as an attraction in Disneyland Tokyo. He also worked for DreamWorks where he was an animator for Spirit: Stallion of the Cimarron and worked in Warner Brothers Studio to animate Scooby-Doo. The same years he worked a Sony Pictures Entertainment where he worked on such sequels as Men in Black II and Stuart Little 2. Later on, he got employed to work in EA Games where he was a lead animator in the Medal of Honor series. In 2006, he left EA and moved to the Blue Ridge Mountains outside of Asheville, North Carolina where he currently lives with his partner Bruce Steele and two cats.

On September 24, 2013, Oakley may have discovered a previously unknown photo of Abraham Lincoln and, with help from college students from the University of North Carolina at Asheville, former Secretary of State William H. Seward, amongst Alexander Gardner's photos of The Gettysburg Address.
