= J. P. Primm =

American basketball player

Personal information
- Born: September 17, 1989 (age 37) Dickson, Tennessee
- Listed height: 6 ft 1 in (1.85 m)

Career information
- High school: Dickson County (Dickson, Tennessee)
- College: UNC Asheville (2008–2012)
- NBA draft: 2012: undrafted
- Playing career: 2012–2015
- Position: Point guard / shooting guard

Career history
- 2012: Kyiv
- 2013: Titanes del Ley
- 2014: Den Helder Kings
- 2014–2015: GIE Maile Matrix

J. P. Primm (born September 17, 1989) is an American basketball player, having previously played for the men's basketball teams of the UNC Asheville Bulldogs. Primm, at 6 feet 1 inch (1.85 m), plays the position of point guard and shooting guard.

== Career ==
In September 2012 Primm went on tryout with BC Kyiv, after he was waived by JSF Nanterre. On September 25, Kyiv decided to keep Primm. He was fired after 9 games, in which he averaged 3.1 points per game. In the summer of 2013, he played for the Titanes del Licey in the Dominican Republic.

In February 2014, he signed with the Dutch team Den Helder Kings.
