= Justice Center =

Arena in Asheville, North Carolina

Coordinates: 35.617507°N 82.567711°W

The Justice Center is a 1,100-seat multi-purpose arena in Asheville, North Carolina built in 1963. The arena was named in 1973 for Charlie "Choo-Choo" Justice, a native of Asheville and former NFL halfback. It is home to the University of North Carolina at Asheville Bulldogs volleyball team and hosted the 2006 Big South Conference women's basketball tournament and 2008 men's tourney.

The Justice Center was replaced by the larger Kimmel Arena for use by UNC Asheville men's and women's basketball teams. The Kimmel Arena was completed in 2011.
