= Big South Conference =

College athletic conference in the southeastern US

- Association: NCAA
- Founded: 1983; 43 years ago
- Commissioner: Sherika A. Montgomery (since 2023)
- Sports fielded: 19; men's: 9; women's: 10
- Division: Division I
- Subdivision: Non-football
- No. of teams: 9
- Headquarters: Charlotte, North Carolina
- Region: South Atlantic States
- Broadcaster: ESPN
- Website: bigsouthsports.com

Locations

The Big South Conference is a collegiate athletic conference affiliated with the NCAA's Division I. The Big South, founded in 1983, is firmly rooted in the South Atlantic region of the United States, with full member institutions located in North Carolina, South Carolina, and Virginia. Associate members are located in Georgia and South Carolina.

== History ==
Big South Conference
Location of Big South members : full

Charter members included Armstrong State (later Armstrong Atlantic State University and now merged into Georgia Southern University as its Armstrong Campus) (1983–1987), Augusta (later Augusta State University and now merged into Augusta University) (1983–1990), Campbell University (1983–1994; 2011–2023), Baptist College (now Charleston Southern University) (1983–present), Coastal Carolina University (1983–2016), Radford University (1983–present) and Winthrop University (1983–present).

The expansion of membership occurred during the 1980s and 1990s. Some of those members are the University of North Carolina at Asheville (1984–present), Davidson College (1990–1992), Liberty University (1991–2018), the University of Maryland, Baltimore County (1992–1998), the University of North Carolina at Greensboro (1992–1997), Towson University (1992–1995), Elon University (1999–2003), High Point University (1999–present) and Birmingham–Southern College (2000–2006).

The Big South Conference began sponsoring football in 2002, with Charleston Southern, Elon (at the time) and Liberty (Gardner–Webb University also joined as a football-only member) fielding teams; Coastal Carolina and Virginia Military Institute (VMI) joined the conference as football-only members in 2003. In that same athletic year, VMI also joined the conference for all sports, but left to re-join the Southern Conference in 2014. Presbyterian College joined the conference in 2007, moving up from Division II, and became eligible for regular-season championships and conference honors during the 2008–09 athletic year. Gardner–Webb, which had been a football-only member since 2002, joined the conference for all sports on July 1, 2008. Campbell rejoined the Big South for all sports except football in the 2011–12 athletic year. Longwood University accepted an invitation to join the Big South on January 23, 2012, and membership formally began July 1 of that year; Longwood had been independent since 2004, during their transition to Division I. In 2014, following the departure of VMI, the conference returned to a single-division structure. On September 1, 2015, Coastal Carolina announced they would leave the conference following the 2015–16 school year to transition to FBS-level football and the Sun Belt Conference. On June 30, 2016, the day before the school joined the Sun Belt, Coastal Carolina won the 2016 College World Series in baseball. This was the first time in conference history that a team won an NCAA championship in any sport.

In September 2016, the Big South and the Atlantic Sun Conference (then officially the ASUN Conference) announced a football partnership that effectively combined the two conferences in that sport. Under its terms, any members of either conference that add or upgrade to scholarship football, provided they fall within the current geographic footprint of the two leagues, automatically join Big South football. At the time of announcement, the only ASUN member that played scholarship football, Kennesaw State, was already a Big South football member. The partnership also provides a guaranteed football home to the leagues' non-scholarship football programs (at that time, Campbell from the Big South, and Jacksonville and Stetson from the ASUN) should they upgrade to scholarship status.

In November 2016, Campbell announced that it would begin offering scholarships and move its football program from the Pioneer Football League to the Big South in 2018.

In December 2016, the University of North Alabama, ASUN, and the Big South Conference announced that, effective in 2018, the school will leave the Division II Gulf South Conference and will join ASUN in non-football sports and the Big South in football. UNA has won three Division II NCAA national championships in football and has won at least a share of the Gulf South Conference football championship for four consecutive seasons through 2016.

Three months later, Liberty announced that it would begin a transition to FBS football in July 2017 and leave the Big South football league in 2018. Liberty and the Big South agreed later in 2017 that the school would continue to house all of its non-football sports (except for field hockey and women's swimming, neither of which is sponsored by the Big South) in that conference for the immediate future. Once Liberty became a full FBS member at the start of the 2019–20 school year, it would have technically become a Big South associate member (barring the school joining an FBS conference). However, Liberty's plans would change several months later, as it instead announced in May 2018 that it would move its non-football sports to the ASUN effective that July (except for the aforementioned field hockey and women's swimming, also not sponsored by the ASUN).

In November 2017, the University of South Carolina Upstate and Hampton University announced that they would be leaving the ASUN and Mid-Eastern Athletic Conference, respectively, to join the Big South, starting in the fall of 2018.

On November 19, 2017, Presbyterian College announced it would be moving its football program to the non-scholarship Pioneer Football League. Presbyterian's last Big South football season was in 2019; the Blue Hose planned to play the 2020 season as an independent before joining the Pioneer League for 2021 and beyond. The Blue Hose remain a member of the Big South in all other sports.

A more recent change to its core membership was the July 2021 arrival of North Carolina A&T State University from the MEAC as a full member, including football. At the same time, Robert Morris University was planned to join as a football-only member. North Carolina A&T joined on the originally planned schedule, but Robert Morris became a Big South football member in November 2020. COVID-19 led the conference to move its 2020 football season to spring 2021. Since two of the eight Big South football members (apart from RMU) chose to play in the originally scheduled fall 2020 season and a third chose not to play football at all in 2020–21, the Big South chose to bring the Colonials into the football league for spring 2021.

More recently, the Big South added three new single-sport members in women's lacrosse effective with the 2022 season (2021–22 school year): Furman University, Mercer University, and Wofford College. All three are full members of the Southern Conference (SoCon), which disbanded its women's lacrosse league after the 2021 season.

On January 25, 2022, the Colonial Athletic Association (now the Coastal Athletic Association) announced that Hampton University would join that conference, as well as CAA Football, its technically separate football league, on July 1, 2022. On February 22, that conference announced that North Carolina A&T State University would be leaving the Big South, joining the all-sports CAA on July 1. North Carolina A&T would play Big South football in 2022 and join CAA Football on July 1, 2023.

Also on February 22, the conference announced its intent to combine its football membership with the Ohio Valley Conference beginning in 2023 and operate as the OVC–Big South Football Association. The following month saw Bryant University announced as a new football-only member effective with the 2022 season. Campbell announced on August 3 that it would join both sides of the CAA in 2023 as well. This was followed by Bryant announcing that it would join CAA Football in 2024. On November 28, it was announced that Robert Morris would also leave the association and return football to its previous home, the Northeast Conference effective after the 2023 football season. This alliance effectively ended on June 18, 2026, when the OVC announced it would return to the OVC name and branding for its football-playing members and brought in Charleston Southern and Gardner–Webb as affiliate members.

On March 21, 2026, the conference announced it would start sponsoring women's flag football in the 2028 season (2027–28 school year), making it the first Division I conference to make such an announcement. At the time of announcement, five full members (Charleston Southern, Gardner–Webb, Radford, UNC Asheville, USC Upstate) had either already added the sport or committed to adding it in the near future. However, it would not be the first D-I conference to officially sponsor the sport; the Mid-Eastern Athletic Conference announced in May 2026 that it would hold its first conference championship in spring 2027.

== Member schools ==
=== Current full members ===
Institution	Location	Founded	Type	Enrollment	Endowment (millions)	Nickname	Joined (Note: Represents the calendar year when fall sports competition begins.)	Colors
Charleston Southern University	North Charleston, South Carolina	1964	Southern; Baptist	3,414	$24	Buccaneers	1983	
Gardner–Webb University	Boiling Springs, North Carolina	1905	Southern; Baptist	3,594	$70.5	Runnin'; Bulldogs	2008	
High Point University	High Point, North Carolina	1924	United; Methodist	4,545	$138.5	Panthers	1999	
Longwood University	Farmville, Virginia	1839	Public	4,470	$100	Lancers	2012	
Presbyterian College	Clinton, South Carolina	1880	Presbyterian (PCUSA)	1,330	$88.1	Blue Hose	2007	
Radford University	Radford, Virginia	1910	Public	10,700	$55.2	Highlanders	1983	
University of North Carolina at Asheville (UNC Asheville)	Asheville, North Carolina	1927	Public (Note: Part of the University of North Carolina System.)	3,762	$52.4	Bulldogs	1984	
University of South Carolina Upstate (USC Upstate)	Spartanburg, South Carolina	1967	Public (Note: Part of the University of South Carolina System.)	6,000	$74	Spartans	2018	
Winthrop University	Rock Hill, South Carolina	1886	Public	6,073	$62.3	Eagles	1983	

=== Current associate members ===
Institution	Location	Founded	Type	Enrollment	Nickname	Joined (Note: Represents the calendar year when fall sports competition begins.)	Colors	Big South sport(s)	Primary conference
Bryant University	Smithfield, Rhode Island	1863	Nonsectarian	3,751	Bulldogs	2025		Men's tennis	America East (AmEast)
Furman University	Greenville, South Carolina	1826	Nonsectarian	2,629	Paladins	2021		Women's lacrosse	Southern (SoCon)
Mercer University	Macon, Georgia	1833	Nonsectarian	9,026	Bears	2021		Women's lacrosse	Southern (SoCon)
New Jersey Institute of Technology (NJIT)	Newark, New Jersey	1881	Public	12,332	Highlanders	2025		Men's tennis	America East (AmEast)
New Jersey Institute of Technology (NJIT)	Newark, New Jersey	1881	Public	12,332	Highlanders	2025		Women's tennis	America East (AmEast)
Wofford College	Spartanburg, South Carolina	1854	United; Methodist	1,773	Terriers	2021		Women's lacrosse	Southern (SoCon)

=== Former full members ===
Institution	Location	Founded	Type	Nickname	Joined (Note: Represents the calendar year when fall sports competition begins.)	Left (Note: Represents the calendar year when spring sports competition ends.)	Colors	Current conference
Armstrong State College (Note: Later known as Armstrong Atlantic State University from 1996 until 2014, then as Armstrong Atlantic University until 2018.)	Savannah, Georgia	1935	Public	Pirates	1983	1987		N/A (Note: Armstrong State, which was last a member of the NCAA Division II Peach Belt Conference, dropped intercollegiate athletics at the end of the 2016–17 school year due to its impending consolidation with Georgia Southern University, effective in 2018.)
Augusta University (Note: Formerly known as Augusta State University until January 2013, when it merged with another Augusta institution (Georgia Health Sciences University) to create Georgia Regents University. At the time of the merger, only GRU (as Augusta State) had an athletic program, and GRU's sports teams continued to compete as "Augusta State" through the end of the 2012–13 school year. The school changed its name again to the current Augusta University in 2015.)	Augusta, Georgia	1785	Public	Jaguars	1983	1990		Peach Belt (PBC) (Note: Currently an NCAA Division II athletic conference.)
Birmingham–Southern College	Birmingham, Alabama	1856	United; Methodist	Panthers	2000	2007		Closed in 2024
Campbell University	Buies Creek, North Carolina	1887	Southern; Baptist	Fighting; Camels	1983 (Note: Campbell was a founding member of the Big South in 1983. The Fighting Camels left the Big South after the 1993–94 school year to join the Trans Atlantic Athletic Conference (TAAC; now the Atlantic Sun Conference); before rejoining in 2011–12 for all sports, except for their football program, which remained in the Pioneer Football League until joining Big South football in the 2018 fall season (2018–19 school year). Campbell then left the Big South again in 2023 to the Colonial Athletic Association as its primary athletic conference.)	1994		Coastal (CAA)
Campbell University	Buies Creek, North Carolina	1887	Southern; Baptist	Fighting; Camels	2011	2023		Coastal (CAA)
Coastal Carolina University	Conway, South Carolina	1954	Public	Chanticleers	1983	2016		Sun Belt (SBC)
Davidson College (Note: Davidson competed as an associate member of the Big South for women's lacrosse from the 2013 to 2014 spring seasons (2012–13 to 2013–14 school years).)	Davidson, North Carolina	1837	Presbyterian (PCUSA)	Wildcats	1990	1992		Atlantic 10 (A10)
Elon University	Elon, North Carolina	1889	Nonsectarian (Note: Has historic ties with the United Church of Christ.)	Phoenix	1999	2003		Coastal (CAA)
Hampton University	Hampton, Virginia	1868	Nonsectarian (Note: Also a historically black college and university.)	Pirates	2018	2022		Coastal (CAA)
Liberty University	Lynchburg, Virginia	1971	Nondenominational	Flames & Lady Flames	1991 (Note: Liberty was ineligible for the Big South football title in its final conference season of 2017 (2017–18 school year), as it had started a transition to FBS football in that season.)	2018		Conf. USA (CUSA)
University of Maryland, Baltimore County (UMBC)	Catonsville, Maryland	1966	Public	Retrievers	1992	1998		America East (AmEast)
North Carolina A&T State University (North Carolina A&T)	Greensboro, North Carolina	1891	Public (Note: Part of the University of North Carolina System.)	Aggies	2021	2022		Coastal (CAA)
University of North Carolina at Greensboro (UNC Greensboro)	Greensboro, North Carolina	1891	Public	Spartans	1992 (Note: The North Carolina–Greensboro (UNC Greensboro) men's basketball and baseball teams joined the Big South a year after becoming a full member for other sports (1993–94).)	1997		Southern (SoCon)
Towson University	Towson, Maryland	1866	Public	Tigers	1992	1995		Coastal (CAA)
Virginia Military Institute (VMI)	Lexington, Virginia	1839	S.M.C.	Keydets	2003	2014		Southern (SoCon)

=== Former associate members ===
Institution	Location	Founded	Type	Nickname	Joined (Note: Represents the calendar year when fall sports competition begins.)	Left (Note: Represents the calendar year when spring sports competition ends.)	Colors	Big South sport(s)	Primary conference	Conference in former Big South sport(s)
Bryant University	Smithfield, Rhode Island	1863	Nonsectarian	Bulldogs	2022	2024		Football	America East (AmEast)	CAA Football (Note: CAA Football is technically a separate entity from the all-sports CAA.)
Bucknell University	Lewisburg, Pennsylvania	1846	Nonsectarian	Bison	2002	2012		Women's golf	Patriot	
Davidson College (Note: Davidson was a full member of the Big South from 1990–91 to 1991–92.)	Davidson, North Carolina	1837	Presbyterian (PCUSA)	Wildcats	2012	2014		Women's lacrosse	Atlantic 10 (A10)	
College of the Holy Cross	Worcester, Massachusetts	1843	Catholic (Jesuit)	Crusaders	2002	2012		Women's golf	Patriot	
Kennesaw State University	Kennesaw, Georgia	1963	Public	Owls	2015	2022		Football	Conf. USA (CUSA)	
Monmouth University	West Long Branch, New Jersey	1933	Private	Hawks	2014	2022		Football	Coastal (CAA)	CAA Football
University of North Alabama	Florence, Alabama	1830	Public	Lions	2019	2022		Football	Atlantic Sun (ASUN)	United (UAC)
North Carolina A&T State University (North Carolina A&T)	Greensboro, North Carolina	1891	Public (Note: Part of the University of North Carolina System.) (Note: Also a historically black college and university.)	Aggies	2022 (Note: Measured from North Carolina A&T's departure as a full Big South member.)	2023		Football	Coastal (CAA)	CAA Football
University of North Carolina Wilmington (UNC Wilmington)	Wilmington, North Carolina	1947	Public	Seahawks	2000	2004		Women's golf	Coastal (CAA)	
Robert Morris University	Moon Township, Pennsylvania	1921	Nonsectarian	Colonials	2020 (Note: Robert Morris was originally intended to join Big South football in the 2021 football season (part of the 2021–22 academic year). With the 2020 Big South football season being moved to spring 2021, RMU was brought into the football league early.)	2024		Football	Horizon	Northeast (NEC)
Stony Brook University (Note: Also known as the State University of New York at Stony Brook.)	Stony Brook, New York	1957	Public (Note: Part of the State University of New York System.)	Seawolves	2008	2013		Football	Coastal (CAA)	CAA Football

=== Membership timeline ===
- Augusta State was merged into Georgia Regents University in January 2013; the merged school renamed itself Augusta University in 2015.

Full member (all sports) Full member (non-football) Associate member (football) Associate member (sport) Other Conference Other Conference

== Sports ==
Teams in Big South competition
Sport	Men's	Women's
Baseball	9	–
Basketball	9	9
Cross country	9	9
Flag football (2027–28)	–	5+
Golf	8	9
Lacrosse	–	9
Soccer	8	9
Softball	–	7
Tennis	6	6
Track and field (indoor)	7	7
Track and field (outdoor)	8	8
Volleyball	–	8

=== Men's sponsored sports by school ===
School	Baseball	Basketball	Cross country	Golf	Soccer	Tennis	Track and field (indoor)	Track and field (outdoor)	Total Big South sports
Charleston Southern	Yes	Yes	Yes	Yes	No	No	Yes	Yes	6
Gardner–Webb	Yes	Yes	Yes	Yes	Yes	Yes	Yes	Yes	8
High Point	Yes	Yes	Yes	Yes	Yes	No	Yes	Yes	7
Longwood	Yes	Yes	Yes	Yes	Yes	Yes	No	Yes	7
Presbyterian	Yes	Yes	Yes	Yes	Yes	Yes	No	No	6
Radford	Yes	Yes	Yes	Yes	Yes	No	Yes	Yes	7
UNC Asheville	Yes	Yes	Yes	No	Yes	Yes	Yes	Yes	7
USC Upstate	Yes	Yes	Yes	Yes	Yes	No	Yes	Yes	7
Winthrop	Yes	Yes	Yes	Yes	Yes	No	Yes	Yes	7
Totals	9	9	9	8	8	4+2	7	8	62+2
Affiliate members
Bryant						Yes			1
NJIT						Yes			1

Notes

Men's varsity sports not sponsored by the Big South Conference which are played by Big South schools:

School	Football	Lacrosse	Swimming	Wrestling
Charleston Southern	OVC	No	No	No
Gardner–Webb	OVC	No	ASUN	SoCon
High Point	No	A-10	No	No
Presbyterian	Pioneer	No	No	SoCon

Notes

In addition to the above, Campbell and USC Upstate count both their male and female cheerleaders as varsity athletes.

=== Women's sponsored sports by school ===
School	Basketball	Cross country	Golf	Lacrosse	Soccer	Softball	Tennis	Track and field (indoor)	Track and field (outdoor)	Volleyball	Total Big South sports
Charleston Southern	Yes	Yes	Yes	No	Yes	Yes	Yes	Yes	Yes	Yes	9
Gardner–Webb	Yes	Yes	Yes	Yes	Yes	Yes	Yes	Yes	Yes	Yes	10
High Point	Yes	Yes	Yes	Yes	Yes	No	No	Yes	Yes	Yes	8
Longwood	Yes	Yes	Yes	Yes	Yes	Yes	Yes	No	Yes	No (Note: Longwood has announced that they will begin sponsoring women's volleyball in 2028.)	8
Presbyterian	Yes	Yes	Yes	Yes	Yes	Yes	Yes	No	No	Yes	8
Radford	Yes	Yes	Yes	Yes	Yes	Yes	No	Yes	Yes	Yes	9
UNC Asheville	Yes	Yes	Yes	No	Yes	No	Yes	Yes	Yes	Yes	8
USC Upstate	Yes	Yes	Yes	No	Yes	Yes	No	Yes	Yes	Yes	8
Winthrop	Yes	Yes	Yes	Yes	Yes	Yes	No	Yes	Yes	Yes	9
Totals	9	9	9	6+3	9	7	5+1	7	8	8	78+4
Affiliate members
Furman				Yes							1
Mercer				Yes							1
NJIT							Yes				1
Wofford				Yes							1

Notes

Women's varsity sports not sponsored by the Big South Conference which are played by Big South schools:

School	Acrobatics & tumbling (Note: Graduated from the NCAA Emerging Sports for Women program in January 2026, with the first NCAA championship to be held in spring 2027.)	Field hockey	Flag football (Note: Part of the NCAA Emerging Sports for Women program, and will become an official Big South sport in 2027–28.)	Rowing	Swimming & diving	Wrestling
Charleston Southern	No	No	No (Note: Charleston Southern will add flag football in 2027–28.)	No	No	No
Gardner–Webb	No (Note: Gardner–Webb announced in 2026 it would add both acrobatics & tumbling and flag football. Its original announcement did not provide a date, but implied that both would start competing no later than 2027–28. Flag football would ultimately start play in 2026–27.)	No	MEAC	No	ASUN	No
High Point	No	No	No	MAC	No	No
Longwood	No	MAC	No	No	No	No
Presbyterian	Independent	No	No	No	No	Independent
Radford	No	No	No (Note: Radford began playing club-level flag football in March 2026, and plans to upgrade the sport to full varsity status.)	No	No	No
UNC Asheville	No	No	No (Note: UNC Asheville will add flag football in 2026–27 as a club sport, and plans to upgrade the sport to full varsity status.)	No	ASUN	No
USC Upstate	No	No	No (Note: USC Upstate will add flag football in 2026–27.)	No	No	No

Notes

In addition to the above, Campbell, Gardner–Webb, Presbyterian, and USC Upstate consider their female cheerleaders to be varsity athletes, with Campbell and Upstate also considering their male cheerleaders as such. Upstate also counts its all-female dance team as a varsity team.

=== Football – players drafted by the NFL ===
Football players from the Big South have been drafted to play professionally in the National Football League.

Name	Position	School	Draft year	Draft pick	NFL team
Tyler Thigpen	QB	Coastal Carolina	2007	Round 7, Pick 217	Vikings
Jerome Simpson	WR	Coastal Carolina	2008	Round 2, Pick 46	Bengals
Brian Johnston	DE	Gardner–Webb	2008	Round 7, Pick 210	Chiefs
Rashad Jennings	RB	Liberty	2009	Round 7, Pick 250	Jaguars
Josh Norman	CB	Coastal Carolina	2012	Round 5, Pick 143	Panthers
Justin Bethel	S	Presbyterian	2012	Round 6, Pick 177	Cardinals
Walt Aikens	CB	Liberty	2014	Round 4, Pick 125	Dolphins
NFL Draftees from the Big South Conference

== Conference champions ==
=== Men's basketball ===
Season	Regular season champion	Tournament champion	Tournament final location
1986	Charleston Southern (5–1)	Charleston Southern	Savannah Civic Center, Savannah, GA
1987	Charleston Southern (12–2)	Charleston Southern	Savannah Civic Center
1988	Coastal Carolina (9–3)	Winthrop	Winthrop Coliseum, Rock Hill, SC
1989	Coastal Carolina (9–3)	UNC Asheville	Winthrop Coliseum
1990	Coastal Carolina (11–1)	Coastal Carolina	Winthrop Coliseum
1991	Coastal Carolina (13–1)	Coastal Carolina	Civic Center of Anderson, Anderson, SC
1992	Radford (12–2)	Campbell	Civic Center of Anderson
1993	Towson State (14–2)	Coastal Carolina	North Charleston Coliseum, North Charleston, SC
1994	Towson State (15–3)	Liberty	North Charleston Coliseum
1995	UNC Greensboro (14–2)	Charleston Southern	Vines Center, Lynchburg, VA
1996	UNC Greensboro (11–3)	UNC Greensboro	Vines Center
1997	UNC Asheville (11–3)	Charleston Southern	Vines Center
1998	UNC Asheville (11–1)	Radford	Vines Center
1999	Winthrop (9–1)	Winthrop	Asheville Civic Center, Asheville, NC
2000	Radford (12–2)	Winthrop	Asheville Civic Center
2001	Radford (12–2)	Winthrop	Roanoke Civic Center, Roanoke, VA
2002	Winthrop, UNC Asheville (10–4)	Winthrop	Roanoke Civic Center
2003	Winthrop (11–3)	UNC Asheville	Vines Center (semis & finals only)
2004	Liberty (12–4)	Liberty	Vines Center (finals only)
2005	Winthrop (15–1)	Winthrop	Winthrop Coliseum (finals only)
2006	Winthrop (13–3)	Winthrop	Winthrop Coliseum (semis & finals only)
2007	Winthrop (14–0)	Winthrop	Winthrop Coliseum (semis & finals only)
2008	UNC Asheville, Winthrop (10–4)	Winthrop	Justice Center, Asheville, NC (semis & finals only)
2009	Radford (15–3)	Radford	Dedmon Center, Radford, VA (finals only)
2010	Coastal Carolina (15–3)	Winthrop	Kimbel Arena, Conway, SC (semis & finals only)
2011	Coastal Carolina (16–2)	UNC Asheville	Kimbel Arena (semis & finals only)
2012	UNC Asheville (16–2)	UNC Asheville	Kimmel Arena, Asheville, NC (quarters, semis & final)
2013	Charleston Southern, High Point (12–4)	Liberty	HTC Center, Conway, SC
2014	High Point (12–4)	Coastal Carolina	HTC Center, Conway, SC
2015	Charleston Southern, High Point (13–5)	Coastal Carolina	HTC Center, Conway, SC
2016	High Point, Winthrop (13–5)	UNC Asheville	Gore Arena, Buies Creek, NC
2017	Winthrop, UNC Asheville (15–3)	Winthrop	Winthrop Coliseum, Rock Hill, SC (quarters, semis, & finals)
2018	UNC Asheville (13–5)	Radford	Dedmon Center, Radford, VA
2019	Campbell, Radford (12–4)	Gardner–Webb	Dedmon Center, Radford, VA
2020	Radford, Winthrop (15–3)	Winthrop	Winthrop Coliseum, Rock Hill, SC
2021	Winthrop (17–1)	Winthrop	Winthrop Coliseum, Rock Hill, SC
2022	Longwood (15–1)	Longwood	Bojangles Coliseum, Charlotte, NC
2023	UNC Asheville (16–2)	UNC Asheville	Bojangles Coliseum, Charlotte, NC
2024	High Point (13–3)	Longwood	Qubein Center, High Point, NC
2025	High Point (14–2)	High Point	Freedom Hall Civic Center, Johnson City, TN

=== Basketball tournament championships by school ===
School	# of tournament championships	Last tournament championship
Winthrop	13	2021
UNC Asheville	6	2023
Coastal Carolina^{†}	5	2015
Charleston Southern	4	1997
Liberty^{†}	3	2013
Radford	3	2018
Longwood	2	2024
High Point	2	2025
Campbell^{†}	1	1992
Gardner–Webb	1	2019
UNC Greensboro^{†}	1	1996

^{†} – Former member of the Big South

=== Football ===
Season	Champion	Record
2002	Gardner–Webb	3–0
2003	Gardner–Webb	4–0
2004	Coastal Carolina	4–0 (10–1)
2005	Charleston Southern	3–1 (7–4)
2005	Coastal Carolina	3–1 (9–2)
2006	Coastal Carolina	4–0 (9–3)
2007	Liberty	4–0 (8–3)
2008	Liberty	5–0 (10–2)
2009	Stony Brook	5–1 (6–5)
2009	Liberty	5–1 (8–3)
2010	Coastal Carolina (Note: Won the Big South Conference's automatic bid to the NCAA Division I Football Championship playoffs.)	5–1 (6–5)
2010	Stony Brook	5–1 (6–5)
2010	Liberty	5–1 (8–3)
2011	Stony Brook	6–0 (8–3)
2012	Coastal Carolina	5–1 (7–4)
2012	Stony Brook	5–1 (9–2)
2012	Liberty	5–1 (6–5)
2013	Coastal Carolina	4–1 (10–2)
2013	Liberty	4–1 (8–4)
2014	Liberty	4–1 (8–4)
2014	Coastal Carolina	4–1 (11–1)
2015	Charleston Southern	6–0 (9–2)
2016	Charleston Southern	4–1 (7–4)
2016	Liberty	4–1 (6–5)
2017	Kennesaw State	5–0 (12–2)
2018	Kennesaw State	5–0 (11–2)
2019	Monmouth	6–0 (11–3)
2020	Monmouth	3–0 (3–1)
2021	Kennesaw State	7–0 (11–2)
2022	Gardner–Webb	5–0 (7–6)
2023	Gardner–Webb	5–1 (7–4)

=== Women's basketball ===
Season	Regular-season champion	Tournament champion	Tournament runner-up
1986–87	Radford	Radford	Campbell
1987–88	Radford & Campbell	Radford	Campbell
1988–89	Radford	Campbell	Radford
1989–90	Radford	Radford	Campbell
1990–91	Campbell	Radford	Campbell
1991–92	Radford	Radford	Campbell
1992–93	UNC Greensboro	Radford	UNC Greensboro
1993–94	UNC Greensboro	Radford	UNC Greensboro
1994–95	UNC Greensboro	Radford	UNC Greensboro
1995–96	UNC Greensboro	Radford	Winthrop
1996–97	UNC Greensboro	Liberty	UNC Greensboro
1997–98	Liberty	Liberty	UNC Asheville
1998–99	Liberty	Liberty	Coastal Carolina
1999–2000	Liberty	Liberty	Coastal Carolina
2000–01	Liberty	Liberty	Elon
2001–02	Liberty	Liberty	Coastal Carolina
2002–03	Liberty	Liberty	High Point
2003–04	Liberty	Liberty	Birmingham–Southern
2004–05	Liberty	Liberty	UNC Asheville
2005–06	Liberty	Liberty	High Point
2006–07	High Point	UNC Asheville	Radford
2007–08	Liberty	Liberty	Radford
2008–09	Liberty	Liberty	Gardner–Webb
2009–10	Gardner–Webb	Liberty	Gardner–Webb
2010–11	Liberty	Gardner–Webb	Liberty
2011–12	Liberty	Liberty	High Point
2012–13	Liberty	Liberty	Longwood
2013–14	High Point	Winthrop	High Point
2014–15	Liberty	Liberty	High Point
2015–16	UNC Asheville	UNC Asheville	Liberty
2016–17	Radford	UNC Asheville	Radford
2017–18	Liberty	Liberty	UNC Asheville
2018–19	Radford	Radford	Campbell
2020–21	High Point	High Point	Campbell
2021–22	Campbell	Longwood	Campbell
2022–23	Gardner–Webb	Gardner–Webb	High Point
2023–24	High Point	Presbyterian	Radford
2024–25	High Point	High Point	Longwood

== Broadcasters (Big South Network / ESPN+) ==
In addition to basketball games being broadcast on regional and national television, member schools of the Big South Conference are required to provide a live stream of all home games in some sports (football, M/W basketball) and a selection of games in others (M/W soccer, volleyball, baseball, softball, W lacrosse). These streams are produced by the university hosting the event, and this collective production effort has operated under the name of "Big South Network" since 2009. Many of the league's championships are also streamed by the membership if hosted on campus, or by a production team provided by the conference if played at a neutral site. Since the 2018-19 season, all of the Big South's livestreamed events have been featured exclusively on the ESPN+ streaming service as part of a long-term partnership between the conference and network.

== National champions ==
School	Sport	Coach	Year	Opponent	Opponent's conference
Coastal Carolina	Baseball	Gary Gilmore	2016	Arizona	Pac-12

== Facilities ==
School	Basketball arena	Capacity	Baseball stadium	Capacity	Soccer stadium	Capacity
Charleston Southern	CSU Field House (Note: Charleston Southern uses the CSU Field House for all conference basketball games. Home games against local rivals or major-conference teams are played at the North Charleston Coliseum when available.); North Charleston Coliseum	790; 11,475	Buccaneer Ballpark	1,500	Buccaneer Field	4,000
Gardner–Webb	Paul Porter Arena	3,500	John Henry Moss Stadium	700	Greene–Harbison Stadium	1,000
High Point	Qubein Center	4,200	George S. Erath Field at Coy O. Williard Baseball Stadium	700	Vert Track and Soccer Stadium	1,100
Longwood	Joan Perry Brock Center	3,000	Bolding Stadium	500	Longwood University Athletics Complex	350
Presbyterian	Templeton Physical Education Center	2,300	Presbyterian College Baseball Complex	500	Martin Stadium at Edens Field	400
Radford	Dedmon Center	3,205	Carter Memorial Stadium	700	Patrick D. Cupp Stadium	5,000
UNC Asheville	Kimmel Arena	3,200	Greenwood Baseball Field, McCormick Field	300, 4,000	Greenwood Field	1,000
USC Upstate	G. B. Hodge Center	878	Cleveland S. Harley Baseball Park	500	County University Soccer Stadium	3,000
Winthrop	Winthrop Coliseum	6,100	Winthrop Ballpark	1,989	Eagle Field	1,500
