= List of Radford Highlanders men's basketball seasons =

The following is a list of Radford Highlanders men's basketball seasons. Representing Radford University in Radford, Virginia, the Highlanders compete in the Big South Conference of the NCAA Division I and are currently led by head coach Darris Nichols. They play their home games out of the 3,000-seat Dedmon Center, their home since 1981. Radford has won six Big South regular season championships, three Big South tournament championships, and has appeared in three NCAA tournaments, the most recent of which was in 2018. They also have appeared in three College Basketball Invitational (CBI) tournaments, advancing as far as the semifinal round in 2023.

== Seasons ==
Statistics overview
Season	Coach	Overall	Conference	Standing	Postseason
Chuck Taylor (NAIA Independent) (1974–1978)
1974–75	Chuck Taylor	11–10			
1975–76	Chuck Taylor	16–12			
1976–77	Chuck Taylor	15–10			
1977–78	Chuck Taylor	14–11			
Chuck Taylor:		56–43			
Joe Davis (NAIA Independent) (1978–1979)
1978–79	Joe Davis	23–4			
Joe Davis (NAIA District 19) (1979–1982)
1979–80	Joe Davis	15–13			
1980–81	Joe Davis	16–12			
1981–82	Joe Davis	19–8			
Joe Davis (NCAA Division II Independent) (1982–1984)
1982–83	Joe Davis	15–11			
1983–84	Joe Davis	17–10			
Joe Davis (NCAA Division I Independent) (1984–1985)
1984–85	Joe Davis	16–12			
Joe Davis (Big South Conference) (1985–1988)
1985–86	Joe Davis	11–17	3–4	4th	
1986–87	Joe Davis	17–14	7–7	4th	
1987–88	Joe Davis	16–14	8–4	3rd	
Joe Davis:		165–115 (.589)	18–15 (.545)		
Oliver Purnell (Big South Conference) (1988–1991)
1988–89	Oliver Purnell	15–13	5–7	5th	
1989–90	Oliver Purnell	7–22	3–9	7th	
1990–91	Oliver Purnell	22–7	12–2	2nd	
Oliver Purnell:		44–42 (.512)	20–18 (.526)		
Ron Bradley (Big South Conference) (1991–2002)
1991–92	Ron Bradley	20–9	12–2	1st	
1992–93	Ron Bradley	16–15	8–8	5th	
1993–94	Ron Bradley	20–8	13–5	2nd	
1994–95	Ron Bradley	16–12	9–7	4th	
1995–96	Ron Bradley	14–13	8–6	5th	
1996–97	Ron Bradley	15–13	8–6	3rd	
1997–98	Ron Bradley	20–10	10–2	2nd	NCAA Division I first round
1998–99	Ron Bradley	20–8	8–2	2nd	
1999–00	Ron Bradley	18–10	12–2	1st	
2000–01	Ron Bradley	19–10	12–2	1st	
2001–02	Ron Bradley	15–16	9–5	3rd	
Ron Bradley:		193–124 (.609)	109–47 (.699)		
Byron Samuels (Big South Conference) (2002–2007)
2002–03	Byron Samuels	10–20	6–8	6th	
2003–04	Byron Samuels	12–16	7–9	6th	
2004–05	Byron Samuels	12–16	7–9	5th	
2005–06	Byron Samuels	16–13	9–7	4th	
2006–07	Byron Samuels	8–22	2–11	7th	
Byron Samuels:		58–87 (.400)	33–44 (.429)		
Brad Greenberg (Big South Conference) (2007–2011)
2007–08	Brad Greenberg	10–20	5–9	7th	
2008–09	Brad Greenberg	21–12	15–3	1st	NCAA Division I first round
2009–10	Brad Greenberg	19–12	13–5	2nd	
2010–11	Brad Greenberg	1–24	0–16	10th	^{[Note A]}
Brad Greenberg:		51–68 (.429)	33–33 (.500)		
Mike Jones (Big South Conference) (2011–2021)
2011–12	Mike Jones	6–26	2–16	11th	
2012–13	Mike Jones	13–19	7–9	3rd (North)	
2013–14	Mike Jones	22–13	10–6	3rd (North)	CBI Quarterfinals
2014–15	Mike Jones	22–12	12–6	T–3rd	CBI Quarterfinals
2015–16	Mike Jones	16–15	9–9	7th	
2016–17	Mike Jones	14–18	8–10	6th	
2017–18	Mike Jones	23–13	12–6	T–2nd	NCAA Division I Round of 64
2018–19	Mike Jones	22–11	12–4	T–1st	
2019–20	Mike Jones	21–11	15–3	T–1st	Postseason cancelled due to COVID-19
2020–21	Mike Jones	15–12	12–6	2nd	
Mike Jones:		174–150 (.537)	99–75 (.569)		
Darris Nichols (Big South Conference) (2021–2025)
2021–22	Darris Nichols	11–18	7–9	T–3rd (North)	
2022–23	Darris Nichols	21–15	12–6	T–2nd	CBI Semifinals
2023–24	Darris Nichols	16–17	5–11	T–8th	
2024–25	Darris Nichols	20–13	9–7	4th	
Darris Nichols:		68–63 (.519)	33–33 (.500)		
Zach Chu (Big South Conference) (2025–present)
2025–26	Zach Chu	16–16	9–7	3rd	
Zach Chu:		16–16 (.500)	9–7 (.563)		
Total:		825–708 (.538)	354–272 (.565)		
National champion Postseason invitational champion Conference regular season champion Conference regular season and conference tournament champion Division regular season champion Division regular season and conference tournament champion Conference tournament champion

^A. Radford was forced to vacate four wins (including two conference wins) from the 2010–11 season due to NCAA recruiting infractions.
