= Radford Highlanders men's basketball statistical leaders =

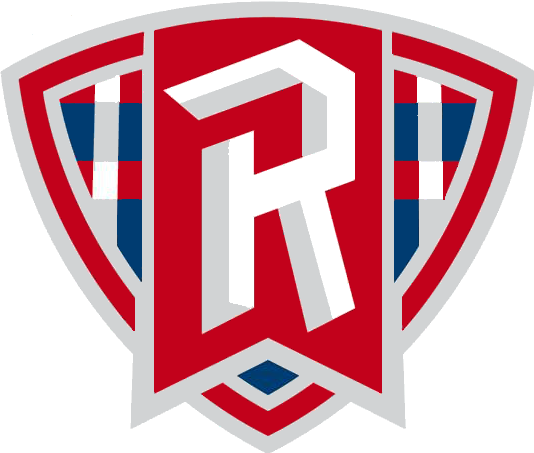

The Radford Highlanders men's basketball statistical leaders are individual statistical leaders of the Radford Highlanders men's basketball program in various categories, including points, assists, blocks, rebounds, and steals. Within those areas, the lists identify single-game, single-season, and career leaders. The Highlanders represent Radford University in the NCAA's Big South Conference.

Radford began competing in intercollegiate basketball in 1974. The NCAA did not officially record assists as a stat until the 1983–84 season, and blocks and steals until the 1985–86 season, but Radford's record books include players in these stats before these seasons. These lists are updated through the end of the 2020–21 season.

== Scoring ==
Career
| Rk | Player | Points | Seasons |
|---|---|---|---|
| 1 | Doug Day | 2,027 | 1989–90 1990–91 1991–92 1992–93 |
| 2 | Javonte Green | 1,911 | 2011–12 2012–13 2013–14 2014–15 |
| 3 | Whit Holcomb-Faye | 1,856 | 2002–03 2003–04 2004–05 2005–06 |
| 4 | Chris Oliver | 1,659 | 2003–04 2004–05 2005–06 2006–07 |
| 5 | R.J. Price | 1,649 | 2011–12 2012–13 2013–14 2014–15 |
| 6 | Anthony Walker | 1,601 | 1993–94 1994–95 1995–96 1996–97 |
| 7 | Ed Polite Jr. | 1,558 | 2015–16 2016–17 2017–18 2018–19 |
| 8 | Carlik Jones | 1,552 | 2017–18 2018–19 2019–20 |
| 9 | Raymond Arrington | 1,456 | 1999–00 2000–01 2001–02 2002–03 |
| 10 | Don Burgess | 1,452 | 1990–91 1991–92 1992–93 1993–94 |

Season
| Rk | Player | Points | Season |
|---|---|---|---|
| 1 | Whit Holcomb-Faye | 669 | 2005–06 |
| 2 | Art Parakhouski | 662 | 2009–10 |
| 3 | Carlik Jones | 641 | 2019–20 |
| 4 | Javonte Green | 593 | 2013–14 |
| 5 | Doug Day | 585 | 1990–91 |
| 6 | Dennis Parker Jr. | 584 | 2025–26 |
| 7 | Doug Day | 572 | 1991–92 |
| 8 | Chris Oliver | 563 | 2006–07 |
| 9 | Wallace Foster | 551 | 1976–77 |
| | Del Jones | 551 | 2025–26 |

Single game
| Rk | Player | Points | Season | Opponent |
|---|---|---|---|---|
| 1 | Dennis Parker Jr. | 53 | 2025–26 | Coppin State |
| 2 | Doug Day | 43 | 1990–91 | Central Connecticut State |

== Rebounds ==
Career
| Rk | Player | Rebounds | Seasons |
|---|---|---|---|
| 1 | Ed Polite Jr. | 1,119 | 2015–16 2016–17 2017–18 2018–19 |
| 2 | Javonte Green | 1,064 | 2011–12 2012–13 2013–14 2014–15 |
| 3 | Chris Oliver | 845 | 2003–04 2004–05 2005–06 2006–07 |
| 4 | Andrey Savtchenko | 823 | 1998–99 1999–00 2000–01 2001–02 |
| 5 | Correy Watkins | 816 | 1998–99 1999–00 2000–01 2001–02 |
| 6 | Art Parakhouski | 783 | 2008–09 2009–10 |
| 7 | Aswan Wainwright | 755 | 1985–86 1986–87 1987–88 1988–89 |
| 8 | Kevin Robinson | 745 | 1994–95 1995–96 1996–97 1997–98 |
| 9 | David Smith | 739 | 1981–82 1982–83 1983–84 1984–85 |
| 10 | Tyrone Travis | 718 | 1989–90 1990–91 1992–93 1993–94 |

Season
| Rk | Player | Rebounds | Season |
|---|---|---|---|
| 1 | Art Parakhouski | 414 | 2009–10 |
| 2 | Art Parakhouski | 369 | 2008–09 |
| 3 | Ed Polite Jr. | 314 | 2018–19 |
| 4 | Andrey Savtchenko | 309 | 2001–02 |
| 5 | Javonte Green | 307 | 2014–15 |
| 6 | Ed Polite Jr. | 294 | 2016–17 |
| 7 | Andrey Savtchenko | 290 | 2000–01 |
| 8 | Javonte Green | 285 | 2013–14 |
| 9 | Ed Polite Jr. | 283 | 2017–18 |
| 10 | Correy Watkins | 282 | 2001–02 |

Single game
| Rk | Player | Rebounds | Season | Opponent |
|---|---|---|---|---|
| 1 | Art Parakhouski | 22 | 2009–10 | VMI |

== Assists ==
Career
| Rk | Player | Assists | Seasons |
|---|---|---|---|
| 1 | Amir Johnson | 604 | 2006–07 2007–08 2008–09 2009–10 |
| 2 | Anthony Walker | 510 | 1993–94 1994–95 1995–96 1996–97 |
| 3 | Carlik Jones | 469 | 2017–18 2018–19 2019–20 |
| 4 | Rashun Davis | 457 | 2012–13 2013–14 2014–15 2015–16 |
| 5 | Whit Holcomb-Faye | 417 | 2002–03 2003–04 2004–05 2005–06 |
| 6 | Rod Cousin | 383 | 1984–85 1985–86 1986–87 1987–88 |
| 7 | R.J. Price | 369 | 2011–12 2012–13 2013–14 2014–15 |
| 8 | Roy Flynn | 336 | 1979–80 1980–81 1981–82 1982–83 |
| 9 | Chris Hawkins | 310 | 1989–90 1990–91 1991–92 |
| 10 | Mike Hornbuckle | 295 | 1998–99 1999–00 2000–01 2001–02 |

Season
| Rk | Player | Assists | Season |
|---|---|---|---|
| 1 | Brian Schmall | 216 | 1992–93 |
| 2 | Carlik Jones | 181 | 2018–19 |
| 3 | Carlik Jones | 175 | 2019–20 |
| 4 | Amir Johnson | 172 | 2008–09 |
| 5 | Amir Johnson | 166 | 2009–10 |
| 6 | Amir Johnson | 155 | 2007–08 |
| 7 | Anthony Walker | 150 | 1994–95 |
| 8 | Rashun Davis | 149 | 2015–16 |
| 9 | Phil Young | 140 | 1988–89 |
| 10 | Josiah Jeffers | 139 | 2022–23 |

Single game
| Rk | Player | Assists | Season | Opponent |
|---|---|---|---|---|
| 1 | Brian Schmall | 15 | 1992–93 | Campbell |

== Steals ==
Career
| Rk | Player | Steals | Seasons |
|---|---|---|---|
| 1 | Javonte Green | 243 | 2011–12 2012–13 2013–14 2014–15 |
| 2 | Ed Polite Jr. | 199 | 2015–16 2016–17 2017–18 2018–19 |
| 3 | Rod Cousin | 192 | 1984–85 1985–86 1986–87 1987–88 |
| 4 | Amir Johnson | 190 | 2006–07 2007–08 2008–09 2009–10 |
| 5 | Blake Smith | 183 | 2009–10 2010–11 2011–12 2012–13 |
| | Anthony Walker | 183 | 1993–94 1994–95 1995–96 1996–97 |
| 7 | Roy Flynn | 177 | 1979–80 1980–81 1981–82 1982–83 |
| 8 | Rashun Davis | 170 | 2012–13 2013–14 2014–15 2015–16 |
| 9 | Chris Hawkins | 167 | 1989–90 1990–91 1991–92 |
| 10 | R.J. Price | 166 | 2011–12 2012–13 2013–14 2014–15 |

Season
| Rk | Player | Steals | Season |
|---|---|---|---|
| 1 | Ed Polite Jr. | 68 | 2017–18 |
| | Javonte Green | 68 | 2013–14 |
| 3 | Chris Hawkins | 67 | 1990–91 |
| | Phil Young | 67 | 1988–89 |
| 5 | Javonte Green | 66 | 2012–13 |
| | Blake Smith | 66 | 2010–11 |
| 7 | Javonte Green | 65 | 2014–15 |
| 8 | Chris Hawkins | 63 | 1991–92 |
| 9 | B.J. Haigler | 61 | 2001–02 |
| | Skip Smith | 61 | 1979–80 |

Single game
| Rk | Player | Steals | Season | Opponent |
|---|---|---|---|---|
| 1 | Chris Hawkins | 8 | 1991–92 | Winthrop |
| | Rian Everett | 8 | 1998–99 | Jacksonville |

== Blocks ==
Career
| Rk | Player | Blocks | Seasons |
|---|---|---|---|
| 1 | Tyrone Travis | 215 | 1989–90 1990–91 1992–93 1993–94 |
| 2 | Nosa Obasuyi | 164 | 1998–99 1999–00 2000–01 2001–02 |
| 3 | Ed Polite Jr. | 159 | 2015–16 2016–17 2017–18 2018–19 |
| 4 | Brandon Holcomb | 148 | 2012–13 2013–14 2014–15 2015–16 |
| 5 | Eric Parker | 124 | 1994–95 1995–96 1996–97 1997–98 |
| 6 | Art Parakhouski | 115 | 2008–09 2009–10 |
| 7 | Jalen Carethers | 110 | 2011–12 2012–13 2013–14 2014–15 |
| 8 | Chris Oliver | 104 | 2003–04 2004–05 2005–06 2006–07 |
| 9 | Eric Hall | 99 | 2005–06 2006–07 2007–08 2008–09 |
| 10 | Correy Watkins | 94 | 1998–99 1999–00 2000–01 2001–02 |

Season
| Rk | Player | Blocks | Season |
|---|---|---|---|
| 1 | Nosa Obasuyi | 74 | 2001–02 |
| 2 | Tyrone Travis | 67 | 1993–94 |
| 3 | Art Parakhouski | 65 | 2009–10 |
| 4 | Tyrone Travis | 62 | 1990–91 |
| 5 | Tyrone Travis | 60 | 1992–93 |
| 6 | Ed Polite Jr. | 55 | 2015–16 |
| 7 | Art Parakhouski | 50 | 2008–09 |
| 8 | Brandon Holcomb | 49 | 2014–15 |
| 9 | Eric Hall | 48 | 2008–09 |
| 10 | Eric Parker | 47 | 1997–98 |

Single game
| Rk | Player | Blocks | Season | Opponent |
|---|---|---|---|---|
| 1 | Tyrone Travis | 7 | 1993–94 | UNCG |
| | Tyrone Travis | 7 | 1992–93 | Bethany |
