= Paul Stoll =

American-born Mexican basketball player

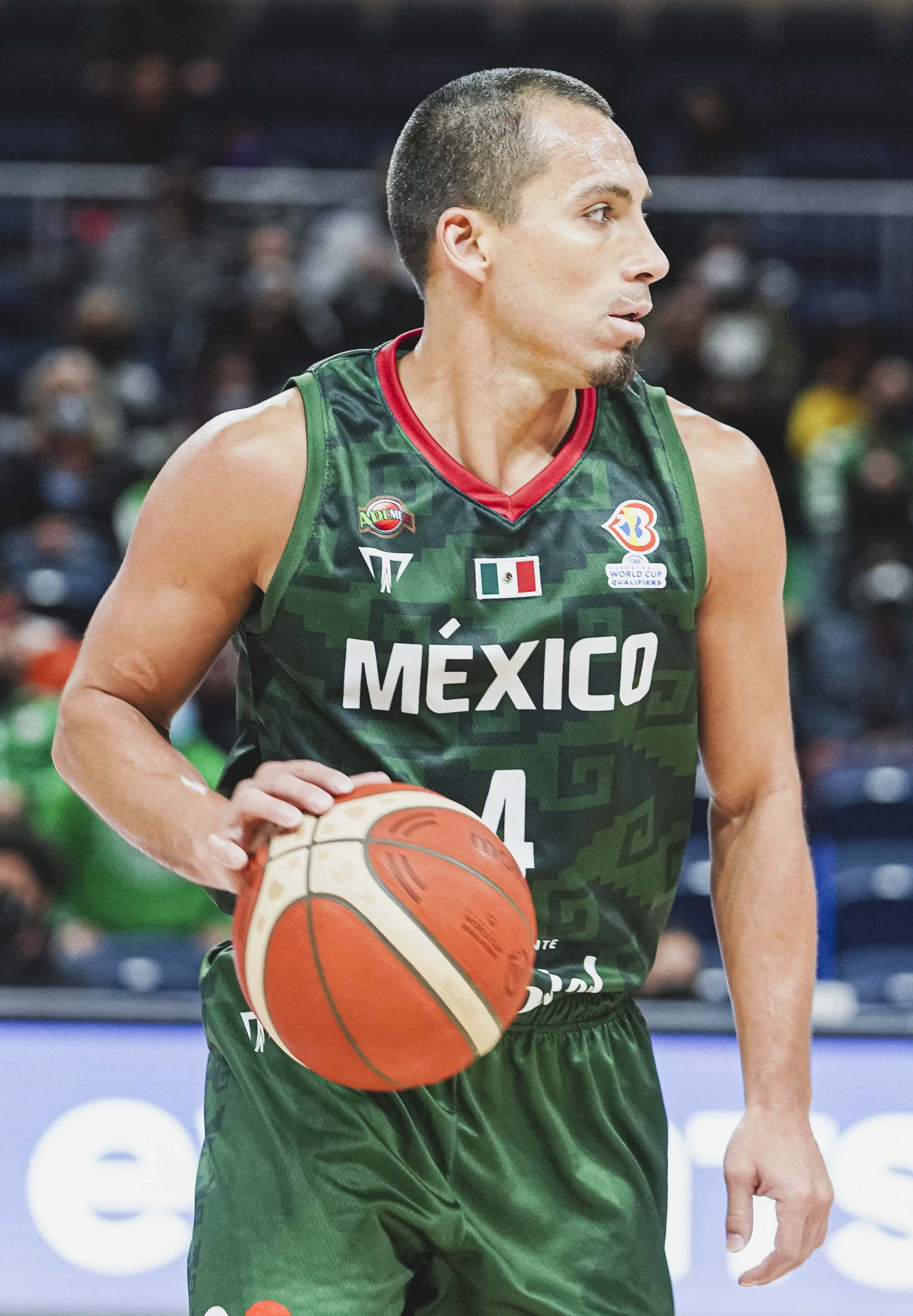
- Stoll with Mexico in 2022

No. 21 – Calor de Cancún
- Position: Point guard
- League: LNBP

Personal information
- Born: December 14, 1985 (age 40) Lansing, Michigan, U.S.
- Listed height: 5 ft 11 in (1.80 m)
- Listed weight: 175 lb (79 kg)

Career information
- High school: East Lansing (East Lansing, Michigan)
- College: Lansing CC (2004–2006); Texas–Pan American (2006–2008)
- NBA draft: 2008: undrafted
- Playing career: 2008–present

Career history
- 2008–2009: Algodoneros de la Comarca
- 2010: Halcones UV Cordoba
- 2010: Algodoneros de la Comarca
- 2010–2011: Halcones Rojos Veracruz
- 2011: Gigantes de Guayana
- 2011–2012: Halcones Rojos Veracruz
- 2012–2013: Maccabi Haifa
- 2013–2014: Trabzonspor
- 2014: Gigantes de Guayana
- 2014–2015: Halcones Rojos Veracruz
- 2015–2016: Avtodor Saratov
- 2016–2017: UNICS Kazan
- 2018: Tecnyconta Zaragoza
- 2018–2019: Maccabi Ashdod
- 2019: Limoges CSP
- 2019: Maccabi Ashdod
- 2020: Fuerza Regia
- 2021: Metropolitans 92
- 2021: Hapoel Tel Aviv
- 2021: Fuerza Regia
- 2022: Hapoel Tel Aviv
- 2022–2023: Libertadores de Querétaro
- 2024: Piratas de Quebradillas
- 2024–2025: Halcones de Xalapa
- 2026: Astros de Jalisco
- 2026–present: El Calor de Cancún

Career highlights
- 2× LNBP champion (2020, 2021); LNBP assists leader (2022); VTB United League assists leader (2016); Israeli League champion (2013); 2× Israeli League All-Star (2013, 2019); All-Independent First Team (2008); Acropolis Tournament assists leader (2021)
Medals
Men's basketball
Representing Mexico
Pan American Games
Silver medal – second place	2011 Guadalajara
FIBA AmeriCup
Gold medal – first place	2013 Venezuela
Centrobasket
Gold medal – first place	2014 Mexico
Silver medal – second place	2016 Panama

Paul Michael Stoll (born December 14, 1985) is an American-born Mexican professional basketball player for El Calor de Cancún of the Liga Nacional de Baloncesto Profesional (LNBP). He played college basketball for Lansing Community College and University of Texas–Pan American.

== Early life and college career ==
Stoll attended East Lansing High School in East Lansing, Michigan. He played college basketball for Lansing Community College's Stars and University of Texas–Pan American's Broncs.

In his senior year at Texas–Pan American, he averaged 14.1 points, 2.6 rebounds, 7.2 assists and 2.5 steals per game.

On March 10, 2008, Stoll was named All-Independent First Team.

== Professional career ==
=== Early years (2008–2012) ===
In 2008, Stoll started his professional career with the Mexican team Algodoneros de la Comarca.

In 2011, Stoll joined the Venezuelan team Gigantes de Guayana. On March 28, 2012, Stoll recorded a career-high 33 points, shooting 8-of-15 from the field, along with 12 assists and five steals in a 120–112 win over Trotamundos.

=== Maccabi Haifa (2012–2013) ===
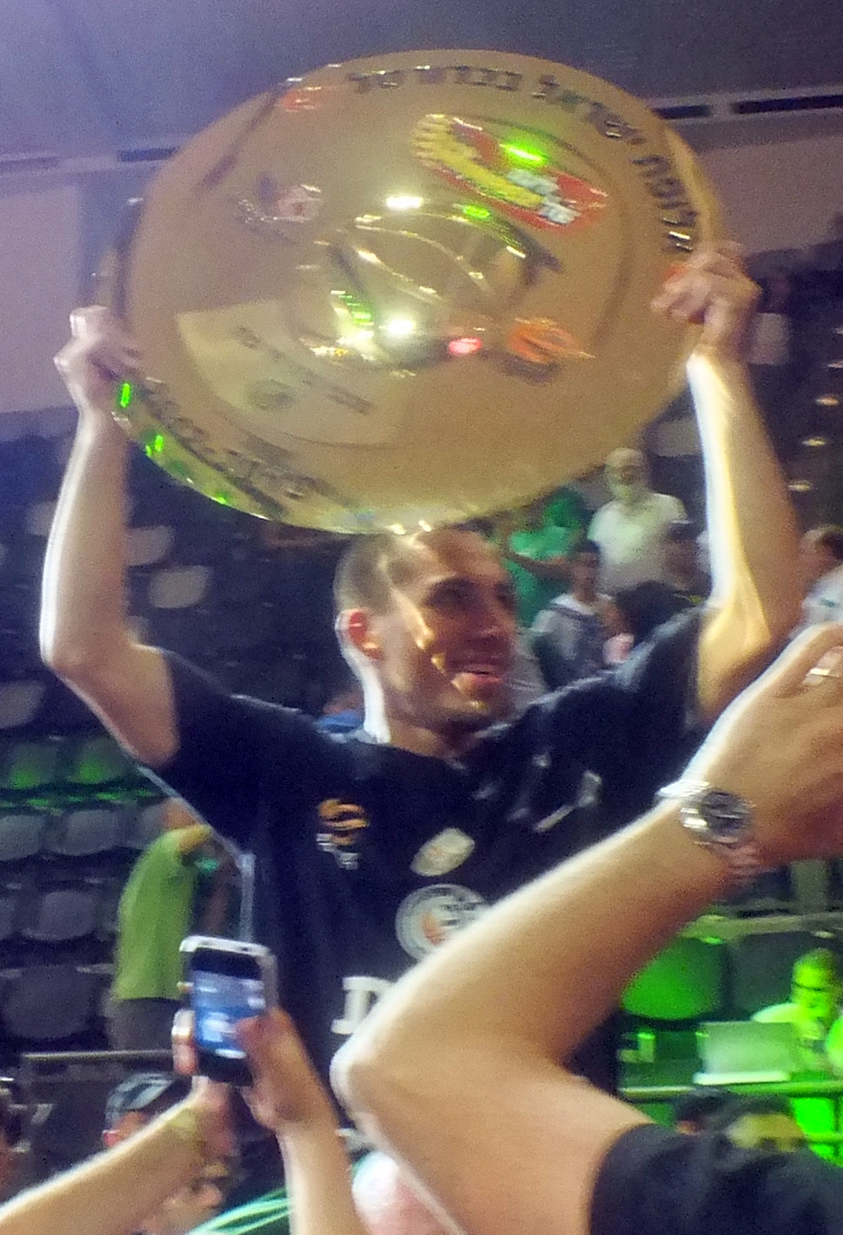
Stoll raises the Israeli League trophy with Maccabi Haifa in June 2013

On June 6, 2012, Stoll signed with the Israeli team Maccabi Haifa for the 2012–13 season. On December 9, 2012, Stoll recorded a season-high 27 points, shooting 10-of-18 from the field, along with four rebounds, four assists and two steals in a 92–103 loss to Hapoel Jerusalem. On March 18, 2013, Stoll participated in the Israeli League All-Star Game and won the Three-point shootout during the same event.

Stoll won the 2013 Israeli League Championship with Maccabi Haifa after an 86–79 win over Maccabi Tel Aviv. In 35 games played during the 2012–13 season, he averaged 14.4 points, 2.9 rebounds, 4.8 assists and 2.4 steals per game, while shooting 43.1% from three-point range.

=== Trabzonspor (2013–2014) ===
On October 30, 2013, Stoll signed a one-year deal with the Turkish team Trabzonspor. On December 29, 2013, Stoll recorded a season-high 26 points, shooting 7-of-11 from three-point range, along with three assists and two rebounds in a 72–64 win over Karşıyaka Basket.

=== Veracruz (2014–2015) ===
On November 26, 2014, Stoll returned to the Mexican team Halcones Rojos Veracruz for a third stint.

=== Avtodor Saratov (2015–2016) ===
On November 3, 2015, Stoll signed with the Russian team Avtodor Saratov. On November 25, 2015, Stoll recorded 21 points, along with four rebounds, seven assists and two steals in a 93–83 win over Beşiktaş. He was subsequently named co-EuroCup round 7 MVP, alongside Billy Baron.

Stoll helped Saratov reach the 2016 VTB United League Playoffs, where they eventually lost to Zenit Saint Petersburg. Stoll finished the season as the VTB United League Assists Leader with 7.1 assists per game, while also averaging 14.6 points, 3.1 rebounds and 2.3 steals per game.

=== UNICS Kazan (2016–2017) ===
On November 29, 2016, Stoll signed with UNICS Kazan for the 2016–17 season.

=== Zaragoza (2018) ===
On March 7, 2018, Stoll signed with the Spanish team Tecnyconta Zaragoza as a replacement for Bo McCalebb.

=== Maccabi Ashdod (2018–2019) ===
On July 18, 2018, Stoll signed a one-year deal with the Israeli team Maccabi Ashdod, joining his former head coach Brad Greenberg. On November 19, 2018, Stoll recorded a double-double of 30 points and 11 assists, along with six steals, leading Ashdod to a 92–86 win over Ironi Nahariya. He was subsequently named Israeli League Round 7 MVP. In 30 games played for Ashdod, he led the league in steals (2.9 per game) and finished second in assists (7.7 per game), while also averaging 15.3 points and 3.3 rebounds per game.

=== Limoges CSP (2019) ===
On November 20, 2019, Stoll signed with Limoges CSP of the French LNB Pro A as an injury cover for Semaj Christon. In 10 games played for Limoges, he averaged 7.4 points and 5.5 assists per game.

=== Return to Ashdod (2019) ===
On December 28, 2019, Stoll returned to Maccabi Ashdod for a second stint, signing for the rest of the season.

=== Fuerza Regia (2020) ===
On November 20, 2020, Stoll helped lead Fuerza Regia to a National Championship in Mexico's LNBP League.

=== Metropolitans 92 (2021) ===
On January 10, 2021, he has signed with Metropolitans 92 of French Pro A on a 1-month deal to replace injured guard Brandon Brown.

=== Hapoel Tel Aviv (2021) ===
On March 20, 2021, he has signed with Hapoel Tel Aviv of Israeli Premier League.

=== Return to Fuerza Regia (2021) ===
On August 9, 2021, he has signed with Fuerza Regia and complete his return to club. He averaged 9.1 points, 4.7 assists, and 1.4 steals per game.

=== Return to Hapoel Tel Aviv (2022) ===
On March 15, 2022, he has signed with Hapoel Tel Aviv of Israeli Premier League.

== National team career ==
Stoll is a member of the Mexico national basketball team. In September 2013, Stoll won the 2013 FIBA Americas Championship and earned a gold medal with the Mexican team, which helped them to secure their place in the 2014 FIBA World Cup.
