= 2008–09 VMI Keydets basketball team =

American college basketball season

2008–09 VMI Keydets men's basketball
- Conference: Big South Conference
- Record: 24–8 (13–5 Big South)
- Head coach: Duggar Baucom (4th season)
- Assistant coaches: Daniel Willis (4th season); Jack Castleberry (1st season); Jason Allison (4th season)
- Home arena: Cameron Hall

2008–09 Big South men's basketball standings
	Conf.				Overall
Team	W		L	PCT	W		L	PCT
Radford †	15	–	3	.833	21	–	12	.636
VMI	13	–	5	.722	24	–	8	.750
Liberty	12	–	6	.667	23	–	12	.657
UNC Asheville	10	–	8	.556	15	–	16	.484
Winthrop	9	–	9	.500	11	–	19	.367
Gardner–Webb	9	–	9	.500	13	–	17	.433
Presbyterian	9	–	9	.500	12	–	17	.414
Coastal Carolina	5	–	13	.278	11	–	20	.355
High Point	4	–	14	.222	9	–	21	.300
Charleston Southern	4	–	14	.222	9	–	20	.310
† 2009 Big South tournament winner As of March 7, 2009; Rankings from AP Poll

The 2008–09 VMI Keydets basketball team represented the Virginia Military Institute during the 2008-09 NCAA Division I men's basketball season. The Keydets were coached by Duggar Baucom in his 4th year at VMI, and played their home games at Cameron Hall. It was VMI's 5th season in the Big South Conference and the Keydets' 101st season of basketball.

VMI opened the year with an upset over the Kentucky Wildcats in Rupp Arena on November 14, 2008, by a score of 111–103. After losses to Virginia and Jacksonville State to drop their record to 4–2, VMI then went on a ten-game winning streak and won their first six conference games before falling to Liberty 91–80, in what was the first sellout in the 27-year history of Cameron Hall.

After finishing the regular season with a 22–7 mark, VMI cruised through their first two Big South tournament games, beating Coastal Carolina 96–76 in the quarterfinals and besting Liberty 78–58 in the semifinals. The Keydets ultimately fell to Radford 108–94 in the Big South Championship game, ending their season at 24–8. The 24 wins in a season were the school's second-most all-time, trailing only the 1976–77 team who 26 wins en route to a Sweet 16 appearance.

== Roster ==
2008–09 VMI Keydets men's basketball team
Players
Coaches

Pos.	#	Name	Height	Weight	Year	Hometown
G	1	Adam Lonon	5 ft 11 in (1.8 m)	175 lb (79 kg)	Jr	Richmond, VA
F	2	Willie Bell	6 ft 6 in (1.98 m)	205 lb (93 kg)	Sr	Newport News, VA
G	3	Chavis Holmes	6 ft 4 in (1.93 m)	195 lb (88 kg)	Sr	Charlotte, NC
G	4	Joey Cantafio	5 ft 6 in (1.68 m)	150 lb (68 kg)	So	Richmond, VA
G	10	Austin Kenon	5 ft 11 in (1.8 m)	180 lb (82 kg)	So	Virginia Beach, VA
F	11	Quinn Brownfield	6 ft 7 in (2.01 m)	195 lb (88 kg)	So	Kyle, TX
F	15	Ron Burks	6 ft 4 in (1.93 m)	205 lb (93 kg)	Fr	Mitchellville, MD
G	20	Carl Josey	6 ft 5 in (1.96 m)	195 lb (88 kg)	Jr	Surrey, England
F	22	Hunter Houston	6 ft 6 in (1.98 m)	195 lb (88 kg)	So	Birmingham, AL
G	21	Keith Gabriel	6 ft 2 in (1.88 m)	180 lb (82 kg)	Fr	Charlotte, NC
F	23	Travis Holmes	6 ft 4 in (1.93 m)	195 lb (88 kg)	Sr	Charlotte, NC
G	31	Michael Sparks	6 ft 4 in (1.93 m)	195 lb (88 kg)	Fr	Lexington, KY
C	32	Wayne Whiting	6 ft 7 in (2.01 m)	240 lb (109 kg)	Fr	Richmond Hill, GA
F	35	Aaron Blosser	6 ft 3 in (1.91 m)	205 lb (93 kg)	Fr	Virginia Beach, VA
C	50	Stephen Sargent	7 ft 0 in (2.13 m)	245 lb (111 kg)	RS Fr	Fayetteville, GA

Head coach

- Duggar Baucom

Assistant coach(es)

- Daniel Willis
- Jack Castleberry
- Jason Allison

Legend

- (C) Team captain
- (S) Suspended
- (I) Ineligible
- (W) Walk-on
- Injured
- Current redshirt

== Schedule ==
Date time, TV	Rank^{#}	Opponent^{#}	Result	Record	Site (attendance) city, state
Regular season
November 14*; 7:00 pm, FSN		at Kentucky	W 111–103	1–0	Rupp Arena (22,579); Lexington, KY
November 16*; 4:00 pm, CSN		at Virginia	L 97–107	1–1	John Paul Jones Arena (9,955); Charlottesville, VA
November 18*; 8:00 pm		Maryland Bible	W 118–72	2–1	Cameron Hall (1,211); Lexington, VA
November 20*; 7:00 pm		Stevenson	W 133–72	3–1	Cameron Hall (846); Lexington, VA
November 24*; 7:00 pm		at Campbell	W 97–92	4–1	Pope Convocation Center (1,531); Buies Creek, NC
November 29*; 7:00 pm		at Jacksonville State	L 67–95	4–2	Pete Mathews Coliseum (753); Jacksonville, AL
December 3; 9:00 pm, MASN		Winthrop	W 92–74	5–2 (1–0)	Cameron Hall (2,846); Lexington, VA
December 6; 4:30 pm		at UNC Asheville	W 114–105	6–2 (2–0)	Justice Center (1,009); Asheville, NC
December 9*; 7:00 pm		Campbell	W 88–76	7–2	Cameron Hall (1,076); Lexington, VA
December 13*; 1:00 pm		Southern Wesleyan	W 113–94	8–2	Cameron Hall (2,446); Lexington, VA
December 21*; 1:00 pm		at Army	W 62–55	9–2	Christl Arena (206); West Point, NY
December 31*; 7:00 pm, MASN		Richmond	W 73–70	10–2	Cameron Hall (3,109); Lexington, VA
January 3; 7:00 pm		at Gardner–Webb	W 96–92	11–2 (3–0)	Paul Porter Arena (1,500); Boiling Springs, NC
January 5; 7:30 pm		at Charleston Southern	W 93–90	12–2 (4–0)	CSU Field House (684); North Charleston, SC
January 10; 1:00 pm		Coastal Carolina	W 103–102	13–2 (5–0)	Cameron Hall (2,875); Lexington, VA
January 12; 7:00 pm		Presbyterian	W 90–75	14–2 (6–0)	Cameron Hall (2,105); Lexington, VA
January 17; 1:00 pm		Liberty	L 80–91	14–3 (6–1)	Cameron Hall (5,029); Lexington, VA
January 21; 7:00 pm		at Radford	W 87–72	15–3 (7–1)	Dedmon Center (3,066); Radford, VA
January 24; 1:00 pm		High Point	W 92–85	16–3 (8–1)	Cameron Hall (3,690); Lexington, VA
January 29*; 7:00 pm		Southern Virginia	W 113–92	17–3	Cameron Hall (2,318); Lexington, VA
February 2; 7:00 pm		UNC Asheville	L 95–103 ^{OT}	17–4 (8–2)	Cameron Hall (2,483); Lexington, VA
February 4; 7:00 pm		at Winthrop	W 110–106 ^{OT}	18–4 (9–2)	Winthrop Coliseum (2,275); Rock Hill, SC
February 7; 2:00 pm		Gardner–Webb	W 94–88	19–4 (10–2)	Cameron Hall (4,084); Lexington, VA
February 9; 7:00 pm		Charleston Southern	W 82–76	20–4 (11–2)	Cameron Hall (2,137); Lexington, VA
February 14; 2:00 pm		at Coastal Carolina	L 97–100	20–5 (11–3)	Kimbel Arena (1,031); Conway, SC
February 16; 7:00 pm		at Presbyterian	L 57–63	20–6 (11–4)	Templeton Physical Education Center (790); Clinton, SC
February 21; 1:00 pm, MASN		Radford	L 90–97	20–7 (11–5)	Cameron Hall (4,744); Lexington, VA
February 24; 7:00 pm		at Liberty	W 109–72	21–7 (12–5)	Vines Center (6,973); Lynchburg, VA
February 28; 7:00 pm		at High Point	W 81–76	22–7 (13–5)	Millis Center (1,642); High Point, NC
2009 Big South Conference men's basketball tournament
March 3; 7:00 pm		Coastal Carolina; Quarterfinal	W 96–76	23–7	Cameron Hall (3,654); Lexington, VA
March 5; 6:00 pm		vs. Liberty; Semifinal	W 78–58	24–7	Dedmon Center (N/A); Radford, VA
March 7; 4:00 pm		at Radford	L 94–108	24–8	Dedmon Center (3,480); Radford, VA
*Non-conference game. ^{#}Rankings from AP Poll. (#) Tournament seedings in parentheses. All times are in Eastern Time.
