= 2009 Big South Conference men's basketball tournament =

- Classification: Division I
- Season: 2008–09
- Teams: 8
- Quarterfinals site: campus sites
- Semifinals site: Dedmon Center; Radford, Virginia
- Finals site: Dedmon Center; Radford, Virginia
- Champions: Radford (2nd title)
- Winning coach: Brad Greenberg (1st title)
- MVP: Artsiom Parakhouski (Radford)
- Television: ESPNU (semifinals); ESPN2 (championship)

2008–09 Big South men's basketball standings
| | Conf. | | | | Overall |
| Team | W | | L | PCT | W | | L | PCT |
|---|---|---|---|---|---|---|---|---|
| Radford † | 15 | – | 3 | .833 | 21 | – | 12 | .636 |
| VMI | 13 | – | 5 | .722 | 24 | – | 8 | .750 |
| Liberty | 12 | – | 6 | .667 | 23 | – | 12 | .657 |
| UNC Asheville | 10 | – | 8 | .556 | 15 | – | 16 | .484 |
| Winthrop | 9 | – | 9 | .500 | 11 | – | 19 | .367 |
| Gardner–Webb | 9 | – | 9 | .500 | 13 | – | 17 | .433 |
| Presbyterian | 9 | – | 9 | .500 | 12 | – | 17 | .414 |
| Coastal Carolina | 5 | – | 13 | .278 | 11 | – | 20 | .355 |
| High Point | 4 | – | 14 | .222 | 9 | – | 21 | .300 |
| Charleston Southern | 4 | – | 14 | .222 | 9 | – | 20 | .310 |
† 2009 Big South tournament winner As of March 7, 2009; Rankings from AP Poll

The 2009 Big South Conference men's basketball tournament took place March 3–7, 2009. It was won by the Radford Highlanders.

Radford defeated VMI in the championship game.

== Format ==
The quarterfinals were held on campus sites, with the higher seed playing host in each game. The semifinals and finals were held at the Dedmon Center in Radford, Virginia.

== Bracket ==
Quarterfinals; March 3
1 | Radford | 82
8 | High Point | 58
5 | Winthrop | 68
4 | UNC Asheville | 76
3 | Liberty | 88
6 | Gardner–Webb | 77
7 | Coastal Carolina | 76
2 | VMI | 96

Semifinals; March 5
1 | Radford | 94
4 | UNC Asheville | 86
3 | Liberty | 58
2 | VMI | 78

Finals; March 7
1 | Radford | 108
2 | VMI | 94
