= 2008–09 Winthrop Eagles men's basketball team =

American college basketball season

2008–09 Winthrop Eagles men's basketball
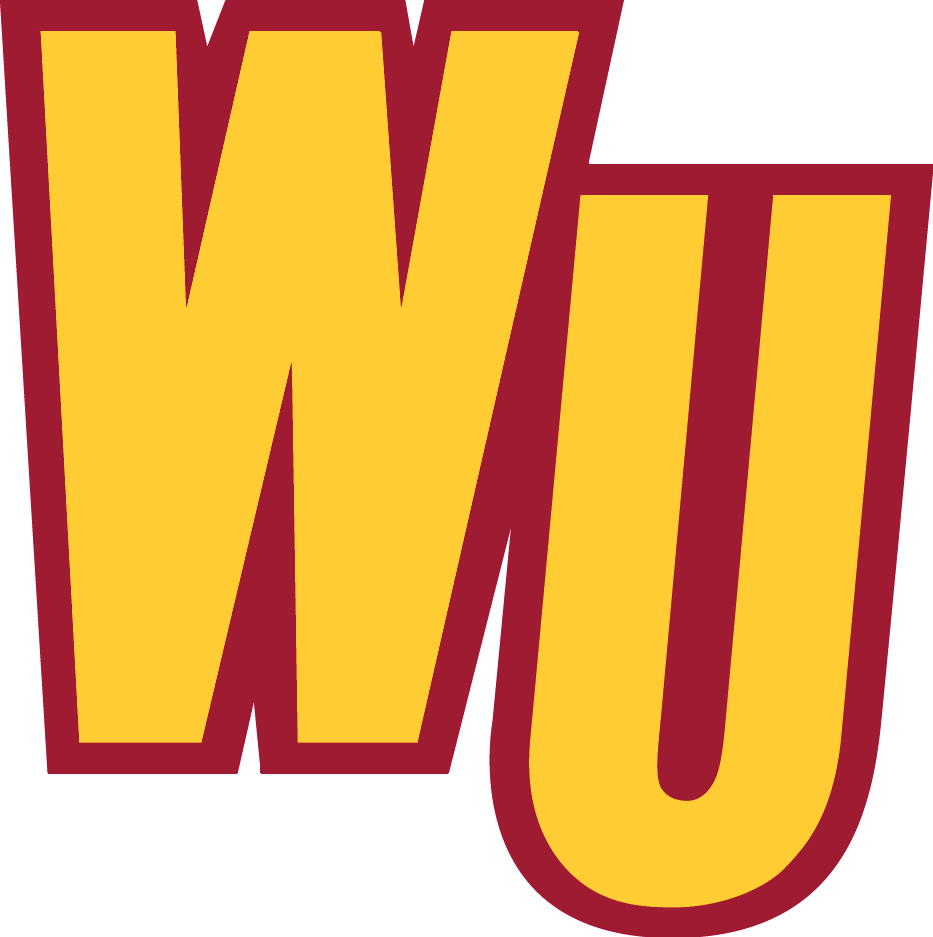
- Conference: Big South
- Record: 11-19 (9-9 Big South)
- Head coach: Randy Peele
- Home arena: Winthrop Coliseum

2008–09 Big South men's basketball standings
	Conf.				Overall
Team	W		L	PCT	W		L	PCT
Radford †	15	–	3	.833	21	–	12	.636
VMI	13	–	5	.722	24	–	8	.750
Liberty	12	–	6	.667	23	–	12	.657
UNC Asheville	10	–	8	.556	15	–	16	.484
Winthrop	9	–	9	.500	11	–	19	.367
Gardner–Webb	9	–	9	.500	13	–	17	.433
Presbyterian	9	–	9	.500	12	–	17	.414
Coastal Carolina	5	–	13	.278	11	–	20	.355
High Point	4	–	14	.222	9	–	21	.300
Charleston Southern	4	–	14	.222	9	–	20	.310
† 2009 Big South tournament winner As of March 7, 2009; Rankings from AP Poll

The 2008–09 Winthrop Eagles men's basketball team represented Winthrop University during the 2009–10 college basketball season. The Eagles competed in the Big South Conference and played their home games at Winthrop Coliseum.

The Eagles lost in the Orange Bowl Basketball Classic to Florida 74–45 in December 2008.

They finished the season with an 11–19 record, losing in the Big South quarterfinal to UNC Asheville in March 2009.
