= 2008–09 Radford Highlanders men's basketball team =

American college basketball season

2008–09 Radford Highlanders men's basketball
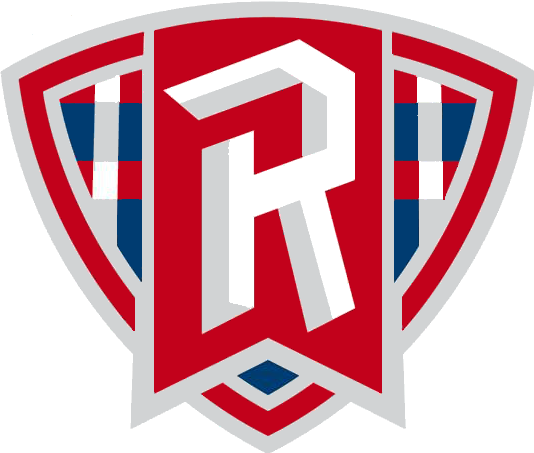

Big South Regular season champion Big South tournament champion

NCAA tournament, first round
- Conference: Big South Conference
- Record: 21–12 (15–3 Big South)
- Head coach: Brad Greenberg (2nd season)
- Home arena: Dedmon Center

2008–09 Big South men's basketball standings
	Conf.				Overall
Team	W		L	PCT	W		L	PCT
Radford †	15	–	3	.833	21	–	12	.636
VMI	13	–	5	.722	24	–	8	.750
Liberty	12	–	6	.667	23	–	12	.657
UNC Asheville	10	–	8	.556	15	–	16	.484
Winthrop	9	–	9	.500	11	–	19	.367
Gardner–Webb	9	–	9	.500	13	–	17	.433
Presbyterian	9	–	9	.500	12	–	17	.414
Coastal Carolina	5	–	13	.278	11	–	20	.355
High Point	4	–	14	.222	9	–	21	.300
Charleston Southern	4	–	14	.222	9	–	20	.310
† 2009 Big South tournament winner As of March 7, 2009; Rankings from AP Poll

The 2008–09 Radford Highlanders men's basketball team represented Radford University during the 2008–09 NCAA Division I men's basketball season. The Highlanders, led by second-year head coach Brad Greenberg, played their home games at the Dedmon Center in Radford, Virginia as members of the Big South Conference. They finished the season 21–12, 15–3 in Big South play to finish in first place. They defeated High Point, UNC Asheville, and VMI to become champions of the Big South tournament. The received the Big South's automatic bid to the NCAA tournament where they were defeated in the first round by the eventual National champions, North Carolina.

== Roster ==
2008–09 Radford Highlanders men's basketball team
Players
Coaches

Pos.	#	Name	Height	Weight	Year	Hometown
G	11	Amir Johnson	5 ft 9 in (1.75 m)	193 lb (88 kg)	RS Sr	Pittsburgh, Pennsylvania
G	24	Kenny Thomas	6 ft 3 in (1.91 m)	182 lb (83 kg)	RS Sr	Richmond, Virginia
C	45	Artsiom Parakhouski	6 ft 11 in (2.11 m)	260 lb (118 kg)	RS Jr	Minsk, Byelorussian SSR

Head coach

- Brad Greenberg (American)

Assistant coach(es)

Legend

- (C) Team captain
- (S) Suspended
- (I) Ineligible
- (W) Walk-on
- Injured
- Current redshirt

Roster

== Schedule and results ==
Date time, TV	Rank^{#}	Opponent^{#}	Result	Record	Site (attendance) city, state
Regular season
Nov 14, 2008*		Brevard	W 74–55	1–0	Peters Hall (575); Radford, Virginia
Nov 18, 2008*		Bridgewater (VA)	W 86–46	2–0	Peters Hall (575); Radford, Virginia
Nov 21, 2008*		at Virginia	L 66–68	2–1	John Paul Jones Arena (10,311); Charlottesville, Virginia
Nov 25, 2008*		at William & Mary	L 53–73	2–2	Kaplan Arena (665); Williamsburg, Virginia
Nov 29, 2008*		at Navy	L 71–73 ^{OT}	2–3	Alumni Hall (1,528); Annapolis, Maryland
Dec 4, 2008		Gardner-Webb	L 71–91	2–4 (0–1)	Peters Hall (575); Radford, Virginia
Dec 6, 2008		Winthrop	W 73–52	3–4 (1–1)	Peters Hall (575); Radford, Virginia
Dec 10, 2008*		Duquesne	L 75–94	3–5	Peters Hall (575); Radford, Virginia
Dec 14, 2008*		James Madison	L 81–85	3–6	Peters Hall (575); Radford, Virginia
Dec 19, 2008*		at George Mason	L 55–67	3–7	Patriot Center (5,164); Fairfax, Virginia
Dec 23, 2008*		at West Virginia	L 54–89	3–8	WVU Coliseum (7,064); Morgantown, West Virginia
Dec 27, 2008*		Shenandoah	W 104–66	4–8	Peters Hall (575); Radford, Virginia
Dec 30, 2008*		at No. 6 Wake Forest	L 61–83	4–9	Lawrence Joel Coliseum (11,253); Winston-Salem, North Carolina
Jan 3, 2009		at Presbyterian	W 65–55	5–9 (2–1)	Templeton Physical Education Center (418); Clinton, South Carolina
Big South tournament
Mar 3, 2009*		High Point; Quarterfinals	W 82–58	19–11	Dedmon Center (1,412); Radford, Virginia
Mar 5, 2009*		UNC Asheville; Semifinals	W 94–86	20–11	Dedmon Center (3,669); Radford, Virginia
Mar 7, 2009*		VMI; Championship game	W 108–94	21–11	Dedmon Center (3,480); Radford, Virginia
NCAA tournament
Mar 19, 2009*; CBS	(16 S)	vs. (1 S) No. 2 North Carolina; First Round	L 58–101	21–12	Greensboro Coliseum (20,226); Greensboro, North Carolina
*Non-conference game. ^{#}Rankings from AP Poll. (#) Tournament seedings in parentheses. S=South Source. All times are in Eastern Time.
