= 1998 Big South Conference men's basketball tournament =

Regional college sports tournament

- Classification: Division I
- Season: 1997–98
- Teams: 7
- Site: Vines Center; Lynchburg, VA
- Champions: Radford (1st title)
- Winning coach: Ron Bradley (1st title)
- MVP: Kevin Robinson (Radford)

1997–98 Big South Conference men's basketball standings
	Conf.				Overall
Team	W		L	PCT	W		L	PCT
UNC Asheville	11	–	1	.917	19	–	9	.679
Radford †	10	–	2	.833	20	–	10	.667
UMBC	6	–	6	.500	14	–	14	.500
Liberty	5	–	7	.417	11	–	17	.393
Coastal Carolina	4	–	8	.333	8	–	19	.296
Winthrop	4	–	8	.333	7	–	20	.259
Charleston Southern	2	–	10	.167	5	–	22	.185
† 1998 Big South tournament winner Rankings from AP Poll

The 1998 Big South Conference men's basketball tournament took place February 25 to 28 in 1998 at the Vines Center in Lynchburg, Virginia, the home of the Liberty Flames. For the first time in their school history, the Radford won the tournament, led by head coach Ron Bradley.

== Format ==
All seven teams participated in the tournament, hosted at the Vines Center. Teams were seeded by conference winning percentage. This was the last season for UMBC as a member of the league.

== Bracket ==
Quarterfinals; February 25
4	Liberty	78
5	Coastal Carolina	70
3	UMBC	67
6	Winthrop	55
2	Radford	75
7	Charleston Southern	68

Semifinals; February 27
1	UNC Asheville	46
4	Liberty	42
3	UMBC	69
2	Radford	88

Finals; February 28
1	UNC Asheville	61
2	Radford	63

- Source

== All-Tournament Team ==
- Kevin Robinson, Radford
- Ryan Charles, Radford
- Corey Reed, Radford
- Kevin Martin, UNC Asheville
- Josh Pittman, UNC Asheville
