= Doug Day =

American basketball player and coach

Personal information
- Born: February 17, 1972 (age 54) Blacksburg, Virginia, U.S
- Listed height: 6 ft 1 in (1.85 m)
- Listed weight: 170 lb (77 kg)

Career information
- High school: Blacksburg (Blacksburg, Virginia)
- College: Radford (1989–1993)
- NBA draft: 1993: undrafted
- Position: Shooting guard
- Number: 20

Career history

Coaching
- 1993–1997: Northside HS (assistant)
- 1997–2002: Blacksburg HS (assistant)
- 2002–present: Blacksburg HS

Career highlights
- 4× All-Big South selection; No. 20 honored by Radford Highlanders

Douglas Mcarthur Day, Jr. (born February 17, 1972) is an American high school basketball coach and former college basketball player.

== Playing career ==
At 6 ft 1 in (1.85 m), Day played the shooting guard position for Radford University between 1989 and 1993. He was a prolific three-point field goal shooter; at the time of his graduation, his 401 made three-pointers were the most in NCAA Division I history, breaking the prior mark of 363 set by Loyola Marymount's Jeff Fryer in 1990. Day led the nation in threes made per game as a junior when he connected for 4.03 per contest. That season, he led the Highlanders to their first Big South Conference men's basketball regular season championship; it was also the second of back-to-back 20-win seasons.

In each of Day's four seasons he was named to an All-Big South team. He graduated in 1993 as the school's all-time leading scorer with 2,027 points, which through the 2024–25 season is still the record. Day also set the still-standing Radford record for points in a game with 43, which he achieved on December 12, 1990 against Central Connecticut State. He holds many of the three-point records at Radford as well, including makes in a game (11, twice), season (117) and career (401); and attempts in a game (19), season (314), and career (1,068).

Day was inducted into the Radford University Hall of Fame in 1998 and the Big South Conference Hall of Fame in 2005.

== Coaching career ==
After graduating from Radford in 1993 with a degree in education, Day began his coaching career as an assistant boys' basketball coach at Northside High School in Roanoke, Virginia. He spent several seasons at Northside until becoming an assistant at his alma mater, Blacksburg High School, in Blacksburg, Virginia. After five seasons, head coach Bob Trear stepped down and in August 2002 Day became the new boys' head coach, a position he still holds today. In 2025–26, Blacksburg finished last in the region with a 1–21 record.

== See also ==
- List of NCAA Division I men's basketball season 3-point field goal leaders
