= Byron Samuels =

American basketball coach (born 1964)

Biographical details
- Born: May 3, 1964 (age 62)

Playing career
- 1982–1986: UNC Asheville
- Position: Forward

Coaching career (HC unless noted)
- 1989–1990: Tulsa (asst.)
- 1990–1991: UNC Wilmington (asst.)
- 1991–1992: Radford (asst.)
- 1992–1994: UNC Wilmington (asst.)
- 1994–1995: Washington State (asst.)
- 1995–1997: Hampton
- 1998–2001: Tennessee (asst.)
- 2001–2002: Radford (asst.)
- 2002–2007: Radford
- 2007–2009: South Florida (asst.)
- 2010–2012: Hillsborough CC (asst. AD)
- 2013–2014: Georgia (Operations Coord.)
- 2014–2017: Florida A&M

Head coaching record
- Overall: 92–194 (.322)

Byron Samuels (born May 3, 1964) is a former college basketball head coach. He was previously the head coach for Florida A&M University.

Originally from Winston-Salem, North Carolina, Samuels played college basketball at UNC Asheville. A forward, Samuels averaged 12.3 points and 7.6 rebounds in his senior season of 1985–86. Samuels graduated from UNC Asheville in 1986 with a bachelor's degree in personnel management. He then completed a master's degree in sociology at Western Carolina University in 1989.

== Head coaching record ==
Record table
Season	Team	Overall	Conference	Standing	Postseason
Hampton (MEAC) (1995–1997)
1995–96	Hampton	9–17	0–0	10th	
1996–97	Hampton	8–19	7–11	7th	
Hampton:		17–36 (.321)	7–11 (.389)		
Radford (Big South Conference) (2002–2007)
2002–03	Radford	10–20	6–8	6th	
2003–04	Radford	12–16	7–9	6th	
2004–05	Radford	12–16	7–9	4th	
2005–06	Radford	16–13	9–7	4th	
2006–07	Radford	8–22	3–11	7th	
Radford:		58–87 (.400)	32–50 (.390)		
Florida A&M (MEAC) (2014–2017)
2014–15	Florida A&M	2–27	2–13	13th	
2015–16	Florida A&M	8–21	4–12	13th	
2016–17	Florida A&M	7–23	5–11	T–11th	
Florida A&M:		17–71 (.193)	11–37 (.229)		
Total:		92–194 (.322)			
National champion Postseason invitational champion Conference regular season champion Conference regular season and conference tournament champion Division regular season champion Division regular season and conference tournament champion Conference tournament champion
