= 2010–11 Radford Highlanders men's basketball team =

American college basketball season

2010–11 Radford Highlanders men's basketball
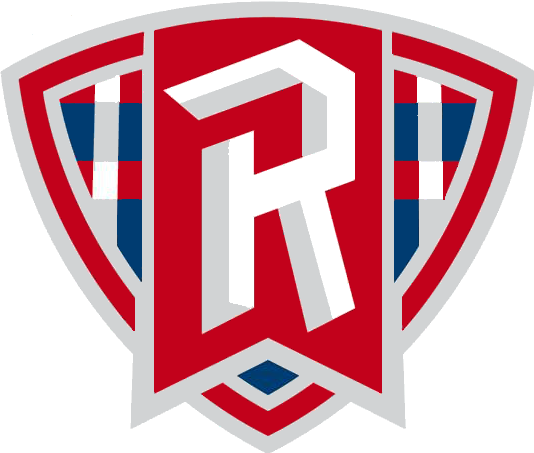
- Conference: Big South Conference
- Record: 5–24 (2–16 BSC)
- Head coach: Brad Greenberg (4th season)
- Home arena: Dedmon Center

The 2010–11 Radford Highlanders men's basketball team represented Radford University in the 2010–11 NCAA Division I men's basketball season. Led by head coach Brad Greenberg, the team played in Big South Conference (BSC). They finished the season 5-24 overall and 2-16 in conference play, however, both of their conference wins and four of their wins overall were vacated due to NCAA violations committed by Greenberg, members of his staff, and a player on his team.

Due to these violations, Radford suspended Greenberg for the final four games of the regular season as a self-imposed punishment. Greenberg resigned shortly after the season concluded.

== Previous season ==
Radford finished the 2009-10 season with a 19-12 record. They earned a 13-5 record in conference play, which was good enough for the six-seed in the 2010 Big South men's basketball tournament. They won their first round game against No.7 Charleston Southern, 64-61, in overtime. The tournament run came to an abrupt end against No. 3 Winthrop, 61-46.

After the season, the team lost Art Parakhouski, two-time Big South Player of the Year and the season's Division I leader in rebounds per game, and second-team All-Big South player Joey Lynch-Flohr to graduation.

== Roster ==
2010–11 Radford Highlanders men's basketball team
Players
Coaches

| Pos. | # | Name | Height | Weight | Year | Hometown |
|---|---|---|---|---|---|---|
| G | 0 | Daniel Mitchell | 6 ft 3 in (1.91 m) | 185 lb (84 kg) | Jr | Blacksburg, VA |
| G | 1 | Jeremy Robinson | 5 ft 10 in (1.78 m) | 170 lb (77 kg) | Sr | Baltimore, MD |
| G | 2 | Evan Faulkner | 6 ft 1 in (1.85 m) | 175 lb (79 kg) | So | Sandy Hook, KY |
| F | 3 | Masse Doumbe | 6 ft 8 in (2.03 m) | 220 lb (100 kg) | Jr | Le Mans, France |
| G | 4 | Jareal Smith | 6 ft 3 in (1.91 m) | 190 lb (86 kg) | Fr | Savannah, GA |
| G | 5 | Görkem Sönmez | 6 ft 5 in (1.96 m) | 215 lb (98 kg) | So | Istanbul, Turkey |
| G | 12 | Allen Dickerson | 6 ft 2 in (1.88 m) | 180 lb (82 kg) | Fr | Radford, VA |
| F | 15 | Tommy Spagnolo (redshirt) | 6 ft 7 in (2.01 m) | 210 lb (95 kg) | | West Jefferson, NC |
| G | 20 | Chance Smith | 6 ft 0 in (1.83 m) | 160 lb (73 kg) | Sr | Roanoke, VA |
| F | 23 | Johnathan Edwards | 6 ft 8 in (2.03 m) | 205 lb (93 kg) | Jr | Queens, NY |
| G | 25 | Blake Smith | 6 ft 4 in (1.93 m) | 175 lb (79 kg) | So | Charlotte, NC |
| C | 32 | Martins Abele | 7 ft 1 in (2.16 m) | 285 lb (129 kg) | Fr | Saldus, Latvia |
| F | 35 | Lukas Winegarner | 6 ft 9 in (2.06 m) | 215 lb (98 kg) | Fr | Sodertalje, Sweden |
| F | 41 | Tolga Cerrah (redshirt) | 6 ft 9 in (2.06 m) | 215 lb (98 kg) | | Ankara, Turkey |

Head coach

Brad Greenberg

Assistant coach(es)

Rick Callahan

Legend

- (C) Team captain
- (S) Suspended
- (I) Ineligible
- (W) Walk-on
- Injured
- Current redshirt

Roster

== Schedule and results ==
| Date time, TV | Opponent | Result | Record | Site (attendance) city, state |
|---|---|---|---|---|
| Nov. 13*; 4:00 PM | Emory & Henry | W 57-54 | 1-0 | Dedmon Center (1,339); Radford, VA |
| Nov. 14*; 4:00 PM | Methodist** | W 83-74 | 2-0 | Dedmon Center (806); Radford, VA |
| Nov. 19*; 7:00 PM | South Carolina | L 56-85 | 2-1 | Colonial Life Arena (10,017); Columbia, SC |
| Nov. 25*; 7:00 PM | George Mason | L 55-81 | 2-2 | Patriot Center (4,273); Fairfax, VA |
| Nov. 27*; 7:30 PM | UNC-Charlotte | L 52-73 | 2-3 | Halton Arena (5,977); Charlotte, NC |
| Dec. 2; 7:00 PM | UNC-Asheville | L 50-70 | 2-4 | Dedmon Center (1,115); Radford, VA |
| Dec. 4; 7:00 PM | Gardner-Webb | L 52-59 | 2-5 | Dedmon Center (821); Radford, VA |
| Dec. 7*; 7:00 PM | Virginia | L 44-54 | 2-6 | John Paul Jones Arena (8,242); Charlottesville, VA |
| Dec. 11*; 7:00 PM | James Madison | L 57-78 | 2-7 | Dedmon Center (1,140); Radford, VA |
| Dec. 18*; 7:00 PM | UNC-Wilmington | L 50-64 | 2-8 | Trask Coliseum (3,378); Wilmington, NC |
| Dec. 22*; 7:00 PM | Florida | L 55-66 | 2-9 | Gainesville, FL (7,825); Stephen C. O'Connell Center |
| Dec. 29*; 2:00 PM | Dickinson** | W 86-59 | 3-9 | Dedmon Center (235); Radford, VA |
| Dec. 31; 2:00 PM | Coastal Carolina | L 59-77 | 3-10 | Kimbel Arena (1,021); Conway, SC |
| Jan. 2; 4:30 PM | Charleston Southern | L 58-73 | 3-11 | Buccaneer Field House (357); Charleston, SC |
| Jan. 8; 7:00 PM | High Point** | W 64-59 | 4-11 | Dedmon Center (735); Radford, VA |
| Jan. 13; 7:00 PM | VMI | L 71-105 | 4-12 | Dedmon Center (735); Radford, VA |
| Jan. 15; 7:00 PM | Liberty | L 53-61 | 4-13 | Dedmon Center (884); Radford, VA |
| Jan. 20; 7:10 PM | Winthrop | L 58-74 | 4-14 | Winthrop Coliseum (1,812); Rock Hill, SC |
| Jan. 22; 7:00 PM | Presbyterian | L 61-67 | 4-15 | Ross E. Templeton Center (533); Clinton, SC |
| Jan. 27; 7:00 PM | Charleston Southern | L 62-70 ^{OT} | 4-16 | Dedmon Center (976); Radford, VA |
| Jan. 29; 6:00 PM | Coastal Carolina | L 63-86 | 4-17 | Dedmon Center (1,542); Radford, VA |
| Feb. 1; 7:00 PM | Winthrop** | W 67-66 | 5-17 | Dedmon Center (871); Radford, VA |
| Feb. 5; 7:00 PM | High Point | L 70-72 | 5-18 | Millis Center (1,543); High Point, NC |
| Feb. 10; 7:00 PM | Liberty | L 71-79 | 5-19 | Vines Center (4,258); Lynchburg, VA |
| Feb. 12; 1:00 PM | VMI | L 58-71 | 5-20 | Cameron Hall (3,510); Lexington, VA |
| Feb. 15; 7:00 PM | Presbyterian | L 49-52 ^{OT} | 5-21 | Dedmon Center (831); Radford, VA |
| Feb. 19*; 7:00 PM | William & Mary | L 52-84 | 5-22 | Kaplan Arena (2,899); Williamsburg, VA |
| Feb. 24; 7:00 PM | Gardner-Webb | L 63-71 | 5-23 | Paul Porter Arena (1,150); Boiling Springs, NC |
| Feb. 26; 2:00 PM | UNC-Asheville | L 58-81 | 5-24 | Justice Center (1,125); Asheville, NC |
*Non-conference game. (#) Tournament seedings in parentheses. **-These wins were vacated due to NCAA violations.

== NCAA infractions ==
In February 2012, the NCAA Division I Committee on Infractions released a report that detailed violations of NCAA rules by Radford men's basketball and tennis head coaches. The NCAA was initially investigating the men's basketball program during the 2010-11 season for violations related to "impermissible benefits" for transportation and lodging for current and prospective players during the winter of 2009-10. However, during the investigation, the NCAA found that head coach Brad Greenberg was intentionally holding evidence from the committee and influencing his coaching staff and a player to lie and impede the NCAA's investigation.

Because of these violations, the Radford men's basketball program was put on a two-year probation from February 2012 to February 2014, lost two of its scholarships during the probation, had to forfeit its wins from the 2010-11 season involving the ineligible player, and pay a $2,000 fine. Greenberg was also issued a five-year show-cause penalty prohibiting him from engaging in recruiting activities. Three of his assistants were issued two-year show-cause penalties.
