= Ron Bradley =

American basketball coach (born 1951)

Biographical details
- Born: February 9, 1951 (age 74); Springfield, Massachusetts, U.S.

Playing career
- 1970–1974: Eastern Nazarene

Coaching career (HC unless noted)
- 1976–1981: Eastern Nazarene
- 1981–1989: Maryland (assistant)
- 1991–2002: Radford
- 2002–2003: James Madison (assistant)
- 2003–2010: Clemson (assistant)
- 2011–2015: DePaul (assistant)
- 2016–2018: Longwood (assistant)

Head coaching record
- Overall: 193–124 (.609)

Accomplishments and honors

Championships
- Big South tournament (1998); 3 Big South regular season (1992, 2000, 2001)

Awards
- Big South Coach of the Year (1992)

Ron Bradley (born February 9, 1951) is a retired men's college basketball coach. Bradley has been inducted into the Hall of Fame as a player at his high school (North Quincy,(MA) HS, College Eastern Nazarene, and the New England Basketball HOF. As a coach he has been inducted into the Radford University and the Big South Conference Halls Of Fame. He was drafted by the New York Nets in 1972 and holds a Ph.D. in Sport Psychology from the University of Maryland, College Park. He has served as associate head coach at DePaul, Clemson, James Madison University, assistant coach for the University of Maryland, College Park and Longwood University, and the head coach at Radford University, where he led the team to its first NCAA tournament. He is a 1973 graduate of the Eastern Nazarene College, where he also served as head coach. In 2009, he was one of 20 semifinalists and later was named assistant coach of the year.

== Head coaching record ==
Statistics overview
Season	Team	Overall	Conference	Standing	Postseason
Radford Highlanders (Big South Conference) (1991–2002)
1991–92	Radford	20–9	12–2	1st	
1992–93	Radford	16–15	8–8	5th	
1993–94	Radford	20–8	13–5	2nd	
1994–95	Radford	16–12	9–7	4th	
1995–96	Radford	14–13	8–6	5th	
1996–97	Radford	15–13	8–6	3rd	
1997–98	Radford	20–10	10–2	2nd	NCAA first round
1998–99	Radford	20–8	8–2	2nd	
1999–00	Radford	18–10	12–2	1st	
2000–01	Radford	19–10	12–2	1st	
2001–02	Radford	15–16	9–5	3rd	
Radford:		193–124 (.609)	109–47 (.699)		
Total:		193–124 (.609)			
National champion Postseason invitational champion Conference regular season champion Conference regular season and conference tournament champion Division regular season champion Division regular season and conference tournament champion Conference tournament champion
