= Artsiom Parakhouski =

Belarusian basketball player (born 1987)

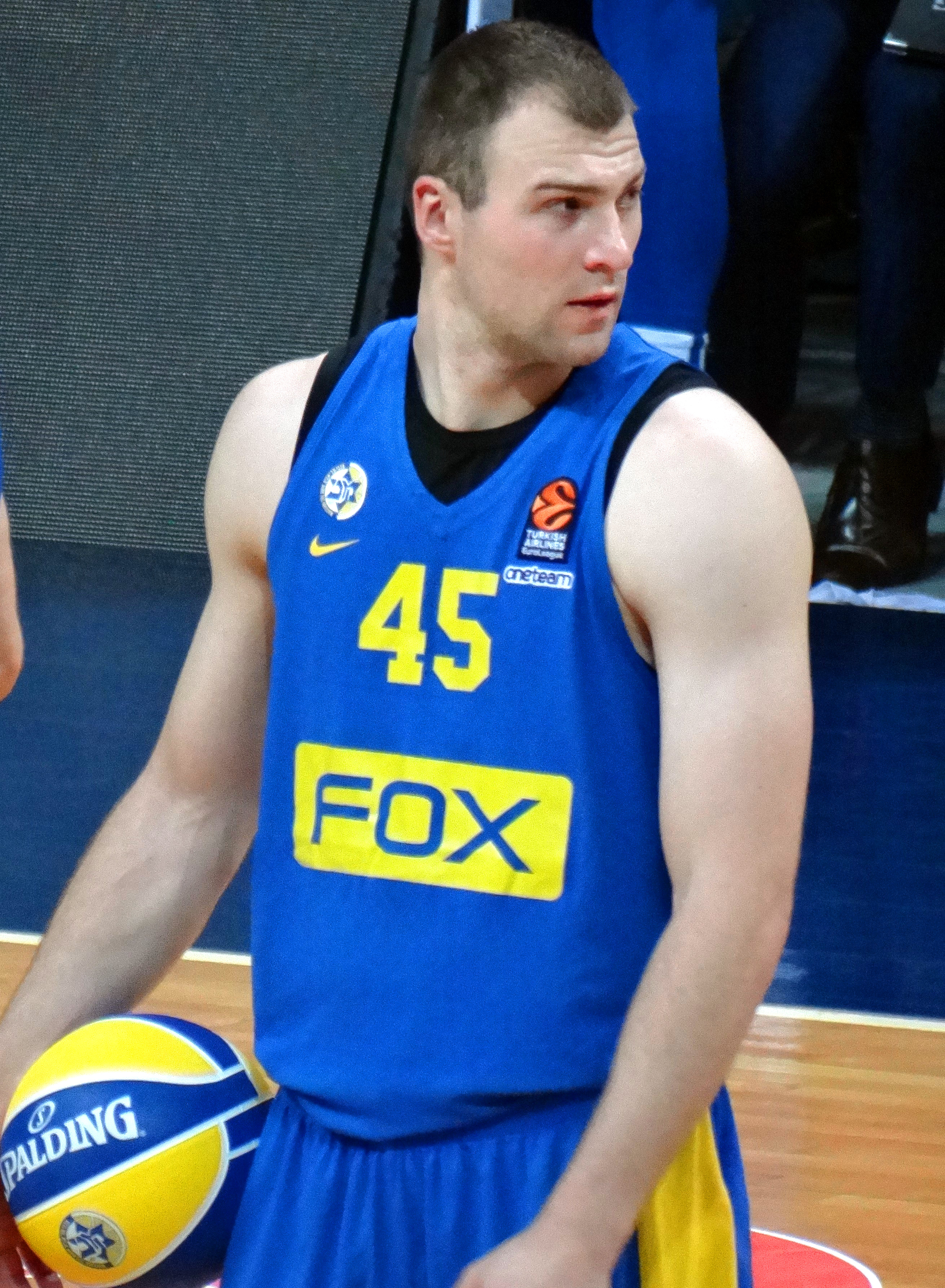
- Parakhouski with Maccabi Tel Aviv in 2018

Personal information
- Born: October 6, 1987 (age 39) Minsk, Byelorussian SSR, Soviet Union
- Listed height: 6 ft 11 in (2.11 m)
- Listed weight: 281 lb (127 kg)

Career information
- College: College of Southern Idaho (2006–2008); Radford (2008–2010)
- NBA draft: 2010: undrafted
- Playing career: 2010–2024
- Position: Center

Career history
- 2010–2011: VEF Rīga
- 2011–2012: Budivelnyk
- 2012–2013: Eskişehir
- 2013–2014: Hapoel Jerusalem
- 2014–2015: Nizhny Novgorod
- 2015–2017: UNICS
- 2017–2018: Maccabi Tel Aviv
- 2018–2019: Rytas
- 2019: Partizan
- 2020: SIG Strasbourg
- 2020: Tsmoki-Minsk
- 2020–2021: Andorra
- 2021–2022: Parma Basket
- 2022–2024: Śląsk Wrocław

Career highlights
- ABA League Supercup (2019); King Mindaugas Cup winner (2019); King Mindaugas Cup MVP (2019); Israeli League champion (2018); Israeli League Cup winner (2017); Latvian Basketball League champion (2011); Baltic League Regular Season MVP (2011); EuroLeague Block Leader (2015); All-VTB United League Second Team (2017); Turkish League Blocks Leader (2013); NCAA rebounding leader (2010); 2× Big South Player of the Year (2009, 2010); 2× First-team All-Big South (2009, 2010)

Artsiom Parakhouski (born October 6, 1987) is a Belarusian former professional basketball player for Śląsk Wrocław. Standing at 6 ft 11 in (2.11 m), he plays at the center position.

He finished his American college career in 2010 with the Radford University Highlanders, located in Radford, Virginia. He led NCAA Division I in rebounds in 2009–10 at 13.4 per game. He was named the Big South Conference Men's Basketball Player of the Year in 2009 and 2010, becoming the fifth multiple player of the year winner in Big South history.

== Early life ==
Born and raised in Minsk by parents who both coached national Belarusian team sports, Parakhouski grew up playing football (soccer) until age 16. He was forced to switch to basketball, a sport he had never even played, when his body grew too large for any realistic football aspirations.

Parakhouski was spotted by Ali Ton, then a Binghamton University men's basketball assistant coach, at the Junior European Championships. Seeing his potential, Ton persuaded Parkhouski to first attend a junior college in the United States before enrolling at a major university to progress in basketball and to simultaneously learn English. At College of Southern Idaho, Parakhouski struggled to grasp the language, admitting "It was hard for me. The first five-to-six months I couldn't speak at all. I couldn't understand anyone around me. I was basically in a jungle with nobody."

When Ton became an assistant coach at Radford University, Parakhouski followed him. Under the guidance of head coach Brad Greenberg he developed into a National Basketball Association (NBA) center prospect following his 2009–10 senior season but was ultimately never drafted.

== College career ==
Parakhouski spent his first two seasons of his NCAA eligibility at College of Southern Idaho, where in 63 games played he averaged 10.1 points and 6.4 rebounds on 60.1% shooting. Parakhouski then spent his final two college seasons as a Radford Highlander.

As a junior in 2008–09, Parakhouski averaged 16.2 points, 11.2 rebounds and 1.5 blocks on 53.7% shooting. He led Radford to win the Big South Conference tournament by scoring 26 points and grabbing 18 rebounds in the championship game. After gaining an automatic berth into the NCAA tournament as the 16th seed, he then scored 10 points and grabbed 10 rebounds against the #1-seed and eventual national champion North Carolina Tar Heels and former National Player of the Year Tyler Hansbrough. In March 2009 he was named the Big South Player of the Year.

Parakhouski repeated as the conference player of the year his senior season in 2009–10. He averaged 13.4 rebounds in 31 games played, which led the nation in rebounds per game. He also scored 21.4 points and block 2.1 shots per game. Parakhouski ended his two-year career at Radford having scored 1,195 points, grabbed 783 rebounds and blocked 115 shots. He was the two-time conference player of the year and was also a two-time First Team All Big South selection.

== Professional career ==
Parakhouski did not get selected in the 2010 NBA draft; however, he played for the Boston Celtics in the 2010 Orlando Pro Summer League. On August 20, 2010, he signed with Latvian club BK VEF Rīga and won the Latvian Basketball League championship.

On June 24, 2014, he signed a two-year deal with the Russian team Nizhny Novgorod. In 2014–15 season, Nizhny Novgorod ended the competition in the VTB United League after being eliminated by CSKA Moscow with 3–0 in the semifinal series.

On July 5, 2015, he signed a one-year contract with the option of another year with UNICS. On March 27, 2017, Parakhouski recorded a double-double with a career-high 30 points and 10 rebounds, shooting 15-of-17 from the field, in a 95–83 win over Avtodor Saratov.

On August 27, 2017, he signed a 1+1 year deal with the Israeli team Maccabi Tel Aviv. On January 5, 2018, Parakhouski recorded a season-high 16 points, shooting 7-of-10 from the field, along with eight rebounds and two steals in an 81–93 loss to Real Madrid. Parakhouski won the 2017 Israeli League Cup and the 2018 Israeli League Championship titles with Maccabi.

On December 19, 2018, he signed with Rytas Vilnius of the Lithuanian Basketball League for the rest of the season. On February 17, 2019, Parakhouski won the 2019 King Mindaugas Cup Finals after scoring 14 points in a 70-67 win over Žalgiris. He was subsequently named the King Mindaugas Cup MVP.

On August 7, 2019, he signed with Partizan NIS Belgrade of the Basketball League of Serbia and EuroCup. On November 20, 2019, he parted ways with Partizan after appearing in 12 games.

On January 12, 2020, he signed with SIG Strasbourg of the French LNB Pro A for the rest of the season.

On December 30, 2020, he has signed with Andorra of the Liga ACB.

On July 22, 2021, he has signed with Parma Basket of the VTB United League.

On August 13, 2022, he has signed with Śląsk Wrocław of the PLK.

== Career statistics ==
Legend
GP	Games played	GS	Games started	MPG	Minutes per game
FG%	Field-goal percentage	3P%	3-point field-goal percentage	FT%	Free-throw percentage
RPG	Rebounds per game	APG	Assists per game	SPG	Steals per game
BPG	Blocks per game	PPG	Points per game	PIR	Performance index rating
**Bold**	Career high

=== EuroLeague ===
*	Led the league

Year	Team	GP	GS	MPG	FG%	3P%	FT%	RPG	APG	SPG	BPG	PPG	PIR
2014–15	Nizhny Novgorod	23	22	**25.2**	.606	.000	.681	**6.7**	**.8**	**.7**	**1.9***	**12.9**	**18.3**
2016–17	UNICS	29	**28**	21.3	.620	—	**.787**	5.1	.4	.3	1.3	11.3	14.1
2017–18	Maccabi	**30**	26	16.2	**.631**	—	.695	3.9	.3	.5	1.0	7.6	9.1
Career		82	76	20.5	.618	.000	.720	5.1	.5	.5	1.4	10.4	13.5

== See also ==
- List of NCAA Division I men's basketball season rebounding leaders
