= 2012–2013 Israeli Basketball Super League Final =

2012–2013 BSL Final
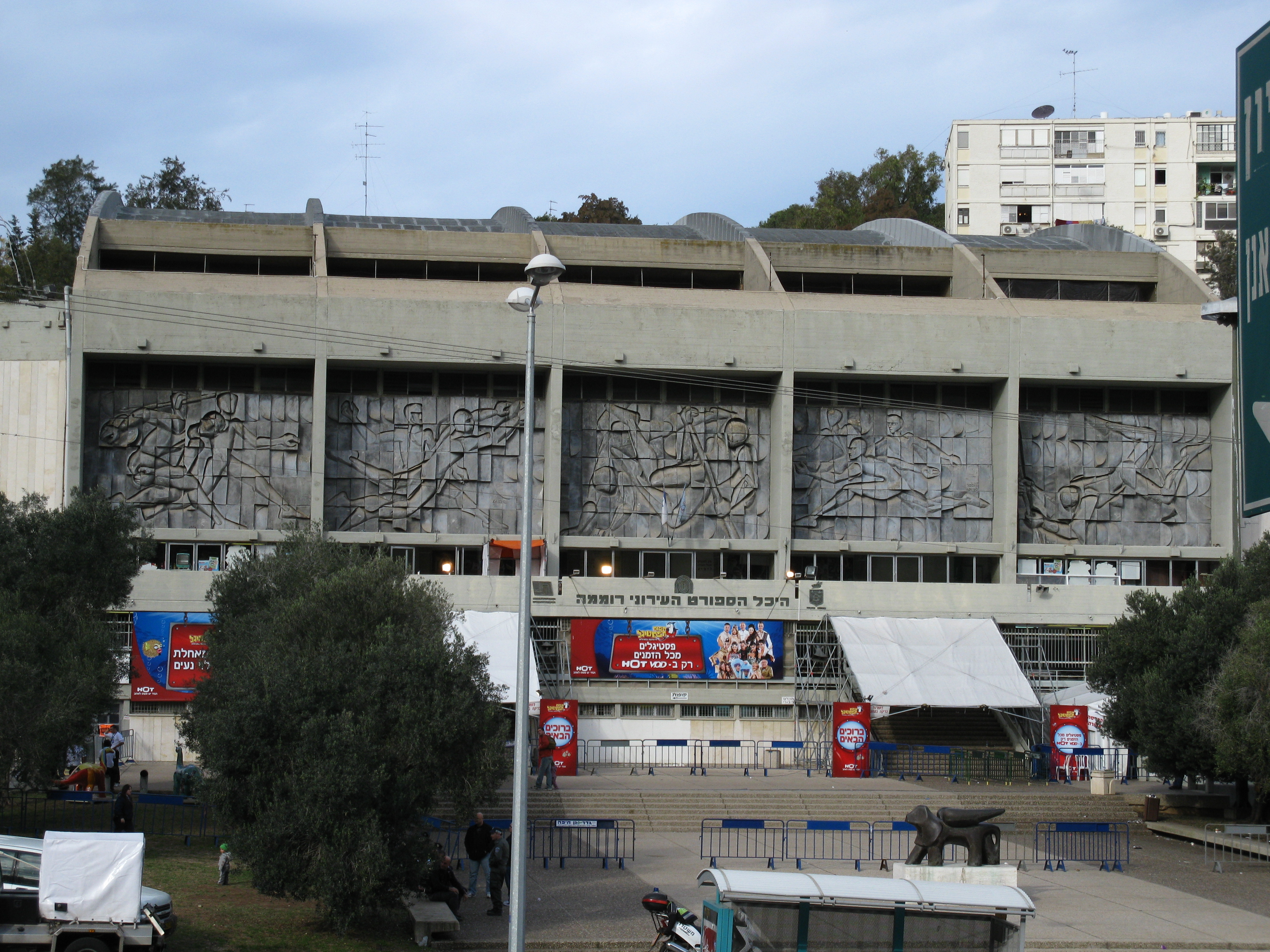
- Romema Arena hosted the Final
| Maccabi Tel Aviv | Maccabi Haifa |
|---|---|
| 79 | 86 |
| | 1 | 2 | 3 | 4 | Total |
|---|---|---|---|---|---|
| Maccabi Tel Aviv | 25 | 17 | 16 | 21 | 79 |
| Maccabi Haifa | 24 | 13 | 20 | 29 | 86 |
- Date: 13 June 2013
- Venue: Romema Arena, Haifa
- MVP: (Greece) Pat Calathes
- Attendance: 5,000

The 2012–2013 BSL final was the championship game of 2012–2013 Israeli Basketball Super League played at the Romema Arena in Haifa on 13 July between defending champion Maccabi Tel Aviv and home team Maccabi Haifa. Maccabi Haifa won their first ever title after an 86–79.

== Road to the final ==
| Maccabi Tel Aviv | | | Maccabi Haifa |
|---|---|---|---|---|
| Opponent | Result | Quarterfinals | Opponent | Result |
| Hapoel Tel Aviv | 76-68 | Game 1 | Hapoel Gilboa Galil | 87-85 |
| Hapoel Tel Aviv | 80-67 | Game 2 | Hapoel Gilboa Galil | 93-81 |
| Hapoel Tel Aviv | 76-74 | Game 3 | Hapoel Gilboa Galil | 93-87 |
| | | Game 4 |
| | | Game 5 |
| Opponent | Result | Semifinals | Opponent | Result |
| Hapoel Jerusalem | 91-73 | Game 1 | Hapoel Eilat | 87-75 |
| Hapoel Jerusalem | 74-68 | Game 2 | Hapoel Eilat | 105-84 |
| Hapoel Jerusalem | 78-72 | Game 3 | Hapoel Eilat | 75-78 (OT) |
| | | Game 4 | Hapoel Eilat | 72-82 |
| | | Game 5 | Hapoel Eilat | 71-68 |

== Match details ==
13 June 2013
20:45

Boxscore

| Maccabi Haifa | 86–79 | Maccabi Tel Aviv |
Scoring by quarter: 24–25, 13–17, 20–16, 29–21
| Pts: Calathes 22; Rebs: Calathes 10; Asts: Mekel, Do.Smith 7 | | Pts: Hickman 28; Rebs: De.Smith 7 Asts: Hickman, Ohayon 5 |

Romema Arena, Haifa
Attendance: 5,000
