= 1997–98 Radford Highlanders men's basketball team =

American college basketball season

1997–98 Radford Highlanders men's basketball
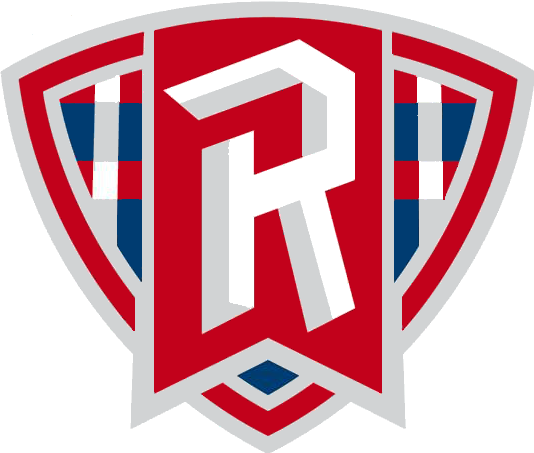

Big South tournament champion

NCAA tournament, first round
- Conference: Big South Conference
- Record: 20–10 (10–2 Big South)
- Head coach: Ron Bradley (2nd season)
- Home arena: Dedmon Center

1997–98 Big South Conference men's basketball standings
	Conf.				Overall
Team	W		L	PCT	W		L	PCT
UNC Asheville	11	–	1	.917	19	–	9	.679
Radford †	10	–	2	.833	20	–	10	.667
UMBC	6	–	6	.500	14	–	14	.500
Liberty	5	–	7	.417	11	–	17	.393
Coastal Carolina	4	–	8	.333	8	–	19	.296
Winthrop	4	–	8	.333	7	–	20	.259
Charleston Southern	2	–	10	.167	5	–	22	.185
† 1998 Big South tournament winner Rankings from AP Poll

The 1997–98 Radford Highlanders men's basketball team represented Radford University during the 1997–98 NCAA Division I men's basketball season. The Highlanders, led by second-year head coach Ron Bradley, played their home games at the Dedmon Center in Radford, Virginia as members of the Big South Conference. They finished the season 20–10, 10–2 in Big South play to finish in second place. They defeated Charleston Southern, UMBC, and UNC Asheville to become champions of the Big South tournament. The received the Big South's automatic bid to the NCAA tournament – the first appearance in program history – where they were defeated in the first round by No. 1 seed Duke.

== Roster ==
1997–98 Radford Highlanders men's basketball team
Players	Coaches
Pos. / # / Name / Height / Weight / Year / Hometown; G / / Corey Reed / 6 ft 6 in (1.98 m) / — / Sr	Head coach: Ron Bradley (Eastern Nazarene); Assistant coach(es) Legend: (C) Team captain; (S) Suspended; (I) Ineligible; (W) Walk-on; Injured; Current redshirt; Roster

== Schedule and results ==
Date time, TV	Rank^{#}	Opponent^{#}	Result	Record	Site (attendance) city, state
Regular season
Nov 14, 1997*		at Norfolk State	W 100–81	1–0	Joseph G. Echols Memorial Hall; Norfolk, Virginia
Nov 22, 1997*		Concord	L 86–104	1–1	Donald N. Dedmon Center; Radford, Virginia
Nov 24, 1997*		Elon	W 86–59	2–1	Donald N. Dedmon Center; Radford, Virginia
Nov 29, 1997*		at Marshall	L 49–67	2–2	Cam Henderson Center; Huntington, West Virginia
Dec 1, 1997*		Ohio	W 72–63 ^{OT}	3–2	Donald N. Dedmon Center; Radford, Virginia
Dec 6, 1997*		at Duquesne	L 82–88	3–3	A.J. Palumbo Center; Pittsburgh, Pennsylvania
Dec 10, 1997*		at Virginia Tech	L 72–79	3–4	Cassell Coliseum; Blacksburg, Virginia
Dec 22, 1997*		at Wake Forest	L 53–85	3–5	Lawrence Joel Veterans Memorial Coliseum; Winston-Salem, North Carolina
Dec 30, 1997*		vs. Cal State Stanislaus; Gossner Classic	W 80–77	4–5	Dee Glen Smith Spectrum; Logan, Utah
Dec 31, 1997*		at Utah State; Gossner Classic	L 73–80 ^{3OT}	4–6	Dee Glen Smith Spectrum; Logan, Utah
Jan 5, 1998*		Tusculum	W 83–72	5–6	Donald N. Dedmon Center; Radford, Virginia
Jan 8, 1998		at UNC Asheville	L 50–53	5–7 (0–1)	Justice Center; Asheville, North Carolina
Jan 10, 1998		UMBC	W 81–78	6–7 (1–1)	Donald N. Dedmon Center; Radford, Virginia
Jan 17, 1998*		at Belmont	W 85–76	7–7	Striplin Gym; Nashville, Tennessee
Jan 21, 1998		Winthrop	W 88–54	8–7 (2–1)	Donald N. Dedmon Center; Radford, Virginia
Jan 24, 1998		at Coastal Carolina	L 55–61	8–8 (2–2)	Kimbel Arena; Conway, South Carolina
Jan 26, 1998		at Charleston Southern	W 82–76	9–8 (3–2)	CSU Field House; North Charleston, South Carolina
Jan 29, 1998*		Belmont	L 56–67	9–9	Donald N. Dedmon Center; Radford, Virginia
Jan 31, 1998		Liberty	W 77–59	10–9 (4–2)	Donald N. Dedmon Center; Radford, Virginia
Feb 2, 1998		at UMBC	W 73–68	11–9 (5–2)	Retriever Activities Center; Baltimore, Maryland
Feb 7, 1998		UNC Asheville	W 91–87	12–9 (6–2)	Donald N. Dedmon Center; Radford, Virginia
Feb 9, 1998		at Winthrop	W 82–60	13–9 (7–2)	Winthrop Coliseum; Rock Hill, South Carolina
Feb 11, 1998*		East Tennessee State	W 81–65	14–9	Donald N. Dedmon Center; Radford, Virginia
Feb 14, 1998		Charleston Southern	W 83–70	15–9 (8–2)	Donald N. Dedmon Center; Radford, Virginia
Feb 16, 1998		Coastal Carolina	W 81–64	16–9 (9–2)	Donald N. Dedmon Center; Radford, Virginia
Feb 21, 1998		at Liberty	W 91–82	17–9 (10–2)	Vines Center; Lynchburg, Virginia
Big South tournament
Feb 25, 1998*	(2)	vs. (7) Charleston Southern; Quarterfinals	W 75–68	18–9	Vines Center; Lynchburg, Virginia
Feb 27, 1998*	(2)	vs. (3) UMBC; Semifinals	W 88–69	19–9	Vines Center; Lynchburg, Virginia
Feb 28, 1998*	(2)	vs. (1) UNC Asheville; Championship game	W 63–61	20–9	Vines Center; Lynchburg, Virginia
NCAA tournament
Mar 13, 1998*	(16 SE)	vs. (1 SE) No. 3 Duke; First round	L 63–99	20–10	Rupp Arena; Lexington, Kentucky
*Non-conference game. ^{#}Rankings from AP Poll. (#) Tournament seedings in parentheses. SE=Southeast Source. All times are in Eastern Time.
