= Brad Greenberg =

American basketball coach (born 1954)

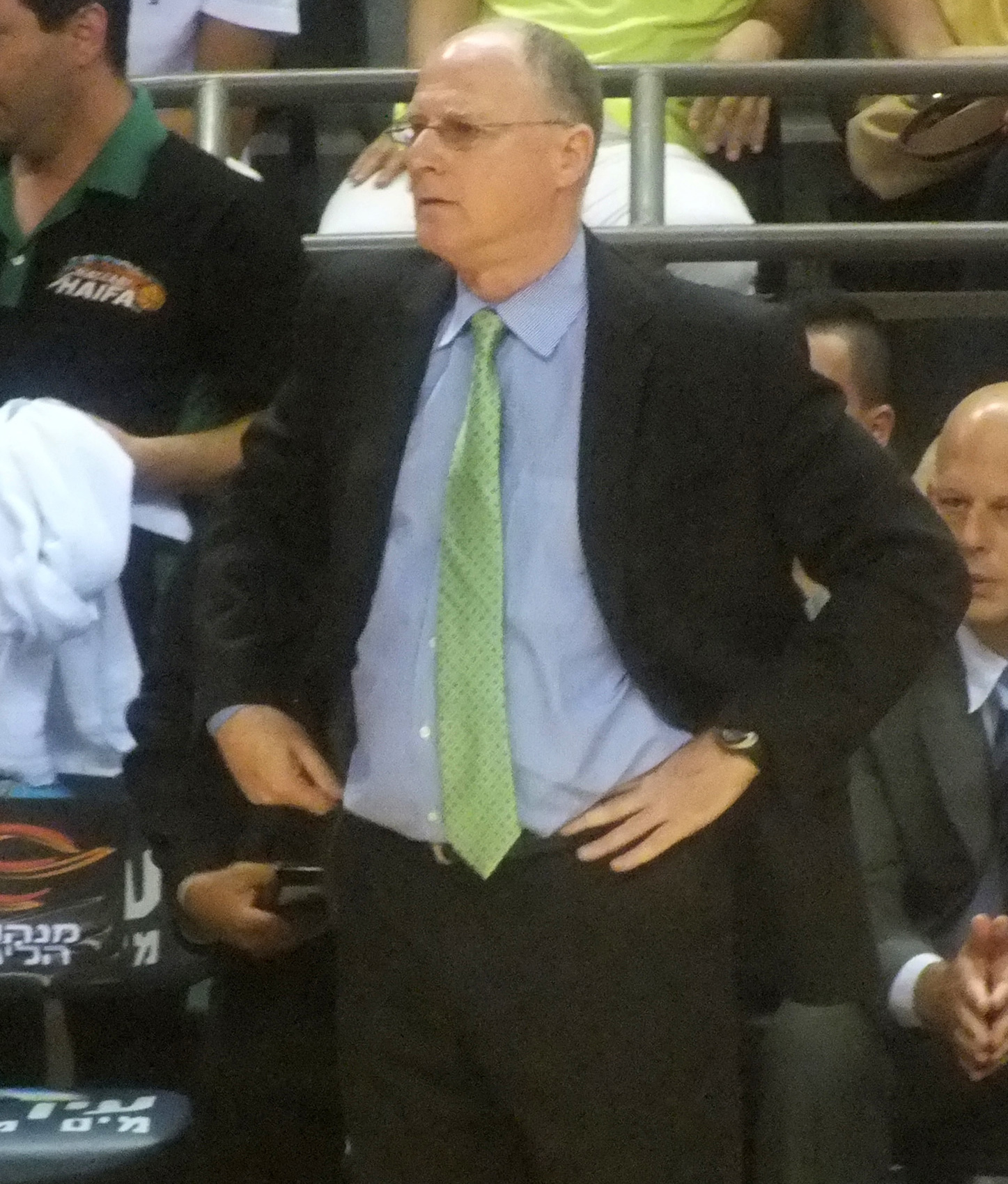
- Greenberg as coach with Maccabi Haifa in 2013

Personal information
- Born: February 24, 1954 (age 72) Plainview, New York, U.S.
- Listed height: 6 ft 0 in (1.83 m)

Career information
- High school: John F. Kennedy (Plainview, New York)
- College: Washington State (1972–1973); American (1974–1977)
- Position: Guard
- Coaching career: 1977–present

Career history

Coaching
- 1977–1978: American (assistant)
- 1978–1984: Saint Joseph's (assistant)
- 1984–1986: Los Angeles Clippers (assistant)
- 1986–1987: New York Knicks (assistant)
- 2003–2004: Virginia Tech (assistant)
- 2004–2007: Virginia Tech (associate HC)
- 2007–2011: Radford
- 2012–2013: Maccabi Haifa
- 2013–2014: Hapoel Jerusalem
- 2014–2015: Eskişehir Basket
- 2015: Avtodor Saratov
- 2016–2017: Eskişehir Basket
- 2017–2020: Maccabi Ashdod
- 2020–2021: Ironi Nes Ziona
- 2021–2022: Mets de Guaynabo
- 2024: Cangrejeros de Santurce

Career highlights
- FIBA Europe Cup champion (2021); Israeli League champion (2013); Israeli League Coach of the Year (2013); Big South tournament champion (2009); Big South regular season champion (2009); Big South Coach of the Year (2009); 2× ECC Tournament champion (1981, 1982); ECC regular season champion (1980)

Brad Howard Greenberg (born February 24, 1954) is an American basketball coach.

== Early life and college playing career ==
Greenberg was one of three sons of Marilyn and Ralph Greenberg of Plainview, New York, on Long Island. One of his brothers, Seth, would also grow up to be a college basketball coach. Brad Greenberg graduated from John F. Kennedy High School in 1972, then went to Washington State University as a freshman and played on the Washington State Cougars basketball team. He transferred to American University in Washington, D.C., and lettered in basketball from 1974 to 1977. Greenberg graduated from American University with a B.A. in interdisciplinary studies in athletics, media, and society.

== Coaching career ==
Greenberg began his coaching career in 1977 as an assistant coach at his alma mater American University. From 1978 to 1984, he was an assistant coach at Saint Joseph's University under Jim Lynam. During Greenberg's time as assistant coach, Saint Joseph's appeared in the NIT in 1979, 1980, and 1984 and the NCAA tournament in 1981 and 1982, including a run to the Elite Eight in 1981. Saint Joseph's also was the 1979–80 regular season champion in the East Coast Conference (ECC) and won the 1981 and 1982 ECC tournaments.

In 1984, Greenberg followed Lynam to the NBA's Los Angeles Clippers, again as an assistant coach. Don Chaney replaced Lynam as head coach in the middle of the 1984–85 season, and Greenberg remained on Chaney's staff until 1986. In the 1986–87 season, Greenberg was an assistant coach for the New York Knicks under head coach Bob Hill.

Greenberg returned to coaching basketball in 2003 after nearly 15 years as an administrator. He joined the staff of head coach and younger brother Seth Greenberg at Virginia Tech. In 2004, Brad Greenberg was promoted to associate head coach. Virginia Tech made the 2005 NIT and 2007 NCAA tournament during Brad Greenberg's stint as assistant coach.

Greenberg was named head coach at Radford University in 2007. In four seasons at Radford, Greenberg had an overall 55–68 record: 10–20 in 2007–08, 21–12 in 2008–09 (including the Big South tournament championship and appearance in the NCAA tournament), 19–12 in 2009–10, and 5–23 in 2010–11.

He resigned his position at Radford University on May 18, 2011, amid NCAA investigations. In February 2012, Radford received two years of probation from the NCAA, but no postseason ban, for major recruiting violations. Greenberg was hit with a five-year show-cause penalty, which effectively barred him from college coaching during that period.

He coached the Bucaneros de La Guaira of the Venezuelan League, in 2011–12, and the team finished the regular season with a 20–16 record and a 3rd place regular season finish. The highest regular season finish in club history at that time.

He was formerly an assistant on former NBA head coach Eric Musselman's coaching staff for the senior Venezuela national basketball team that hosted FIBA's 2012 Men's Basketball Olympic Qualifying Tournament.

On July 7, 2017, Greenberg was named Maccabi Ashdod head coach, signing a two-year deal. In his first season with Ashdod, he led them to the 2018 Israeli League Playoffs as the fourth seed, but they eventually were eliminated by Hapoel Tel Aviv.

On June 16, 2019, Greenberg signed a one-year contract extension with Ashdod. His contract was extended for the 2019/2020 season however the club was dragging down and when the Coronavirus struck, Greenberg left the team; which was demoted by the end of the season.

On July 22, 2019, Greenberg was named Canada national team assistant coach for the 2019 FIBA World Cup.

On August 5, 2020, he has signed with Ironi Nes Ziona of the Israeli Premier League. On April 25, 2021, he led Ness Ziona to a FIBA Europe Cup title.

On September 2, 2021, he signed with the Guaynabo Mets of the Baloncesto Superior Nacional of Puerto Rico league as Head Coach.

== Scouting and administrative career ==
In 1989, he joined the Portland Trail Blazers front office as director of player personnel and remained in that position (renamed vice president of player personnel in 1992) until 1995.

In the 1996–97 season, Greenberg was general manager and vice president of basketball operations for the Philadelphia 76ers. During his stint as general manager, the Philadelphia 76ers drafted scoring sensation Allen Iverson, dubbed by Philly fans as "The Answer," with 1996's first overall pick. In Iverson's third NBA season, the Sixers ended a string of seven consecutive losing seasons and simultaneously started a five-season NBA playoff run. However, Greenberg was fired after the 76ers finished the season 22–60.

Greenberg has also worked as a scout for various NBA teams and other agencies. In 2000, he was an executive at HoopsTV.com. From 2001 to 2003, Greenberg was director of basketball operations at the University of South Florida.

== Head coaching record ==
=== College ===
Record table
Season	Team	Overall	Conference	Standing	Postseason
Radford Highlanders (Big South Conference) (2007–2011)
2007–08	Radford	10–20	5–9	7th	
2008–09	Radford	21–12	15–3	1st	NCAA Division I First Round
2009–10	Radford	19–12	13–5	2nd	
2010–11	Radford	5–24	2–16	10th	
Radford:		55–68	35–33		
Total:		55–68			
National champion Postseason invitational champion Conference regular season champion Conference regular season and conference tournament champion Division regular season champion Division regular season and conference tournament champion Conference tournament champion

=== Israeli Basketball Super League ===
Legend
Regular season	G	Games coached	W	Games won	L	Games lost	W–L %	Win–loss %
Playoffs	PG	Playoff games	PW	Playoff wins	PL	Playoff losses	PW–L %	Playoff win–loss %

Team	Year	G	W	L	W–L%	Finish	PG	PW	PL	PW–L%	Result
Maccabi Haifa	2012–13	27	17	10	.630	2nd	9	7	2	.778	Won BSL Final
Hapoel Jerusalem	2013–14	28	21	7	.750	2nd	8	4	4	.500	Lost in semi-finals
Career		55	38	17	.690	2nd	17	11	6	.647	
