= List of Long Beach State Beach men's basketball head coaches =

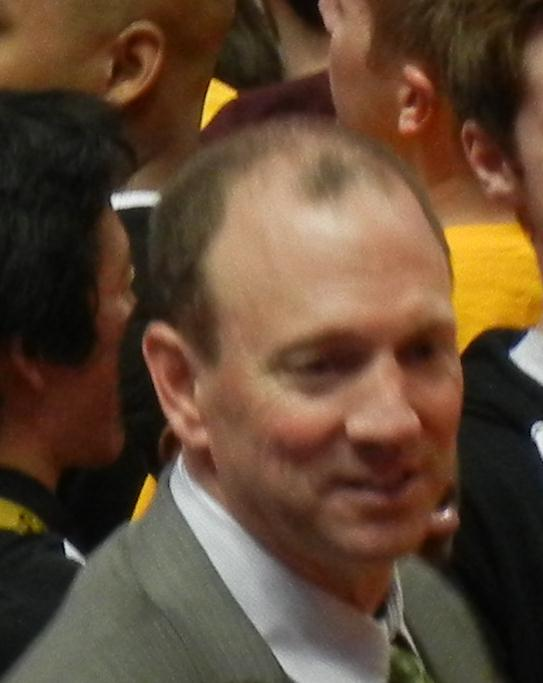
Dan Monson, the current head coach of the Long Beach State Beach, and the winningest head coach in Beach men's basketball history.

The following is a list of Long Beach State Beach men's basketball head coaches. There have been 16 head coaches of the Beach in their 73-season history.

Long Beach State's last head coach was Dan Monson who was relieved of his duties at the end of the 2024 season. He was hired as the Beach's head coach in April 2008, replacing Larry Reynolds, who was fired after the 2006–07 season.

No.	Tenure	Coach	Years	Record	Pct.
1	1950–1952	Herm Schwarzkopf	2	13–27	.325
2	1952–1957	Earl Kidd	5	48–71	.403
3	1957–1960	Bill Patterson	3	37–33	.529
4	1960–1967	Dick Perry	7	82–96	.461
5	1967–1968	Randy Sandefur	1	12–13	.480
6	1968–1973	Jerry Tarkanian	5	122–20	.859
7	1973–1974	Lute Olson	1	24–2	.923
8	1974–1978	Dwight Jones	4	70–40	.636
9	1978–1983	Tex Winter	5	78–69	.531
10	1983–1984	Dave Buss	1	9–19	.321
11	1984–1987	Ron Palmer	3	23–64	.264
12	1987–1990	Joe Harrington	3	53–36	.596
13	1990–1996	Seth Greenberg	6	105–70	.600
14	1996–2002	Wayne Morgan	6	91–84	.520
15	2002–2007 (Note: Long Beach State vacated 14 victories from the 2005–06 season. Reynolds' on-court record is 63–83 (.432).)	Larry Reynolds	5	49–83	.371
16	2007–2024	Dan Monson	16	254–257	.497
Totals		16 coaches	73 seasons	1,070–985	.521
Records updated through end of 2022–23 season Source
