= Dave Buss =

American basketball coach (1938–2024)

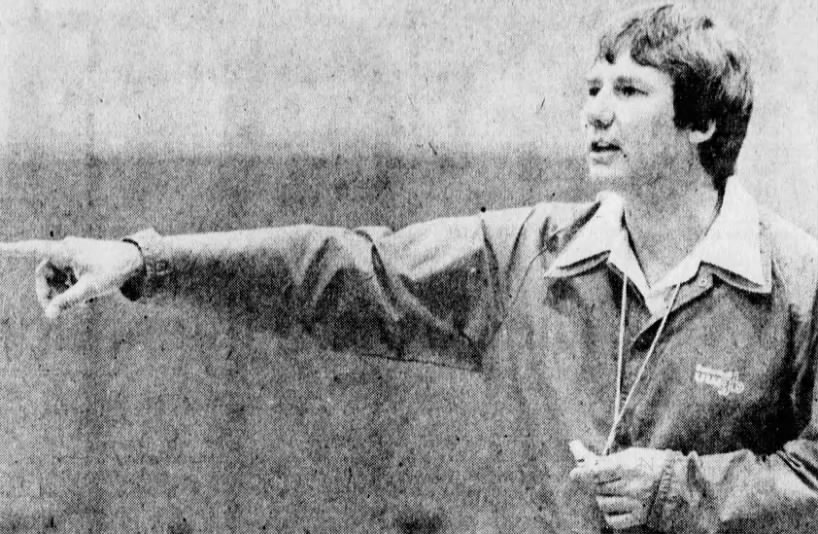
- Buss in 1979

Biographical details
- Born: April 20, 1938; Marshfield, Wisconsin, U.S.
- Died: July 2024 (aged 86)
- Education: University of Wisconsin–Eau Claire

Coaching career (HC unless noted)
- 19??–19??: Palmyra HS
- ???–1960s: Winona State (MN) (assistant)
- 1967–1969: West Virginia Tech (assistant)
- 1969–1982: Green Bay
- 1982–1983: UNLV (assistant)
- 1983–1984: Long Beach State

Head coaching record
- Overall: 23–32

Accomplishments and honors

Awards
- NCAA Division II Coach of the Year (1979)

David R. Buss (April 20, 1938 – July 11, 2024) was an American basketball coach.

== Life and career ==
Buss was born in Marshfield, Wisconsin. He played baseball at Coalinga Junior College and Florida State University. He attended the University of Wisconsin–Eau Claire, earning his bachelor's degree.

Buss began his coaching career at Palmyra High School. After coaching at Palmyra, he served as an assistant coach at Winona State University and West Virginia Tech.

In 1969, Edward Weidner hired Buss to serve as head coach for the Green Bay Phoenix men's basketball team. He was fired on April 9, 1982 and was replaced by assistant head coach Dick Lien.

In September 1982, Buss was hired to serve as an assistant coach at the University of Nevada, Las Vegas. The next year, he was named to replace Tex Winter as head coach for the Long Beach State Beach men's basketball team. He resigned from his head coaching position in 1984.

Buss died on July 11, 2024, at the age of 86.

== Honors ==
In 1979, Buss was named as NCAA Division II Coach of the Year.
