= 2006–07 Long Beach State 49ers men's basketball team =

American college basketball season

2006–07 Long Beach State 49ers men's basketball
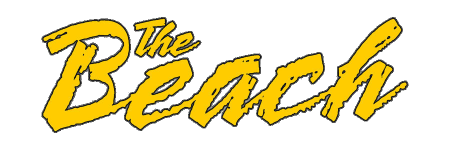

Big West Regular Season Champions Big West tournament champions

NCAA Tournament, Round of 64
- Conference: Big West Conference
- Record: 24–8 (12–2 Big West)
- Head coach: Larry Reynolds (5th season)
- Home arena: Walter Pyramid

2006–07 Big West men's basketball standings
| | Conf. | | | | Overall |
| Team | W | | L | PCT | W | | L | PCT |
|---|---|---|---|---|---|---|---|---|
| Long Beach State† | 12 | – | 2 | .857 | 24 | – | 8 | .750 |
| Cal State Fullerton | 9 | – | 5 | .643 | 20 | – | 10 | .667 |
| Cal Poly | 9 | – | 5 | .643 | 19 | – | 11 | .633 |
| UC Santa Barbara | 9 | – | 5 | .643 | 18 | – | 11 | .621 |
| UC Irvine | 6 | – | 8 | .429 | 15 | – | 18 | .455 |
| Cal State Northridge | 5 | – | 9 | .357 | 14 | – | 17 | .452 |
| Pacific | 5 | – | 9 | .357 | 12 | – | 19 | .387 |
| UC Riverside | 1 | – | 13 | .071 | 7 | – | 24 | .226 |
† 2007 Big West tournament winner As of April 10, 2007; Rankings from AP poll

The 2006–07 Long Beach State 49ers men's basketball team represented California State University, Long Beach during the 2006–07 NCAA Division I men's basketball season. The 49ers, led by fifth year head coach Larry Reynolds, played their home games at Walter Pyramid and were members of the Big West Conference. They finished the season 24–8, 12–2 in Big West play to be crowned regular season champions. They were also champions of the Big West Basketball tournament to earn the conference's automatic bid into the 2007 NCAA tournament where they lost in the opening round to Tennessee.

== Roster ==
2006–07 Long Beach State 49ers men's basketball team
| Players | Coaches |
|---|---|
| Pos. / # / Name / Height / Weight / Year / Hometown; G / 55 / Aaron Nixon / 6 ft 1 in (1.85 m) / 219 lb (99 kg) / Sr / Cleveland, Ohio | Head coach: Larry Reynolds; Assistant coach(es) Legend: (C) Team captain; (S) Suspended; (I) Ineligible; (W) Walk-on; Injured; Current redshirt |

== Schedule and results ==
| Date time, TV | Rank^{#} | Opponent^{#} | Result | Record | Site (attendance) city, state |
Regular season
| Nov 14, 2006*; 5:00 p.m. | | vs. Air Force; CBE Classic | L 68–69 | 0–1 | Maples Pavilion; Stanford, California |
| Nov 15, 2006*; 5:00 p.m. | | vs. San Jose State; CBE Classic | W 86–67 | 1–1 | Maples Pavilion; Stanford, California |
| Nov 17, 2006*; 7:35 p.m. | | Cal State Bakersfield | W 73–70 | 2–1 | Walter Pyramid; Long Beach, California |
| Nov 24, 2006*; 7:30 p.m., Prime Ticket | | at USC | L 61–79 | 2–2 | Galen Center; Los Angeles, California |
| Nov 28, 2006*; 7:30 p.m. | | at No. 1 UCLA | L 58–88 | 2–3 | Pauley Pavilion (8,428); Los Angeles, California |
| Dec 2, 2006* | | at Temple | L 49–74 | 2–4 | Liacouras Center; Philadelphia, Pennsylvania |
| Dec 3, 2006* | | at UMBC | W 57–53 | 3–4 | Retriever Activities Center; Catonsville, Maryland |
| Dec 7, 2006*; 7:00 p.m. | | Pepperdine | W 95–90 | 4–4 | Walter Pyramid; Long Beach, California |
| Dec 9, 2006* | | Sacramento State | W 76–55 | 5–4 | Walter Pyramid; Long Beach, California |
| Dec 17, 2006*; 3:00 p.m. | | at San Jose State | W 76–67 | 6–4 | The Event Center (1,224); San Jose, California |
| Dec 22, 2006*; 7:05 p.m. | | at Loyola Marymount | W 66–65 | 7–4 | Gersten Pavilion; Los Angeles, California |
| Dec 28, 2006*; 7:00 p.m. | | at UC Davis | W 89–75 | 8–4 | The Pavilion; Davis, California |
| Dec 30, 2006*; 7:05 p.m. | | Manhattan | W 74–61 | 9–4 | Walter Pyramid; Long Beach, California |
| Jan 4, 2007 | | UC Santa Barbara | W 101–65 | 10–4 (1–0) | Walter Pyramid; Long Beach, California |
| Jan 6, 2007 | | Cal Poly | W 77–70 | 11–4 (2–0) | Walter Pyramid; Long Beach, California |
| Jan 13, 2007 | | at Cal State Northridge | L 83–90 | 11–5 (2–1) | Matadome; Northridge, California |
| Jan 18, 2007 | | Cal State Fullerton | W 95–85 | 12–5 (3–1) | Walter Pyramid; Long Beach, California |
| Jan 20, 2007 | | UC Riverside | W 99–65 | 13–5 (4–1) | Walter Pyramid; Long Beach, California |
| Jan 25, 2007 | | at UC Irvine | L 84–88 | 13–6 (4–2) | Bren Events Center (3,182); Irvine, California |
| Feb 1, 2007 | | Cal State Northridge | W 79–72 | 14–6 (5–2) | Walter Pyramid; Long Beach, California |
| Feb 3, 2007; 7:35 p.m. | | Pacific | W 92–64 | 15–6 (6–2) | Walter Pyramid; Long Beach, California |
| Feb 8, 2007 | | at Cal Poly | W 80–77 | 16–6 (7–2) | Mott Gym; San Luis Obispo, California |
| Feb 10, 2007 | | at UC Santa Barbara | W 68–67 | 17–6 (8–2) | UC Santa Barbara Events Center; Santa Barbara, California |
| Feb 14, 2007 | | at Cal State Fullerton | W 94–84 | 18–6 (9–2) | Titan Gym; Fullerton, California |
| Feb 17, 2007*; 10:05 p.m. | | Hawaii | L 78–93 | 18–7 | Walter Pyramid; Long Beach, California |
| Feb 24, 2007*; 4:00 p.m. | | UC Davis | W 102–77 | 19–7 | Walter Pyramid; Long Beach, California |
| Feb 26, 2007 | | at Pacific | W 82–76 | 20–7 (10–2) | Alex G. Spanos Center; Stockton, California |
| Mar 1, 2007 | | UC Irvine | W 85–80 | 21–7 (11–2) | Walter Pyramid (2,732); Long Beach, California |
| Mar 3, 2007 | | at UC Riverside | W 91–75 | 22–7 (12–2) | Student Recreation Center; Riverside, California |
Big West Conference Tournament
| Mar 9, 2007* | | vs. UC Irvine; Semifinals | W 77–63 | 23–7 | Honda Center; Anaheim, California |
| Mar 10, 2007* | | vs. Cal Poly; Championship game | W 94–83 | 24–7 | Honda Center; Anaheim, California |
NCAA Tournament
| Mar 16, 2007* | (12 S) | vs. (5 S) No. 25 Tennessee; First Round | L 86–121 | 24–8 | Nationwide Arena; Columbus, Ohio |
*Non-conference game. ^{#}Rankings from AP Poll. (#) Tournament seedings in parentheses. All times are in Pacific Time (#) during NCAA Tournament is seed with Region.
