= 2006–07 NCAA Division I men's basketball season =

Basketball season

- Preseason AP No. 1: Florida Gators
- Regular season: November 7, 2006– March 11, 2007
- NCAA Tournament: 2007
- Tournament dates: March 15 – April 2, 2007
- National Championship: Georgia Dome; Atlanta, Georgia
- NCAA Champions: Florida Gators
- Other champions: West Virginia Mountaineers (NIT)
- Player of the Year (Naismith, Wooden): Kevin Durant, Texas Longhorns

The 2006–07 NCAA Division I men's basketball season began on November 7, 2006, progressed through the regular season and conference tournaments, and concluded with the 2007 NCAA Division I men's basketball tournament championship game on April 2, 2007, at the Georgia Dome in Atlanta, Georgia. The Florida Gators successfully defended their national championship with an 84–75 victory over the Ohio State Buckeyes.

== Season headlines ==
- The Florida Gators successfully defended their national championship, becoming the first team in 15 years to win consecutive titles. The Florida also became the first school to win both the NCAA football and basketball championships during the same academic year.
- The Gators' Lee Humphrey broke Bobby Hurley's NCAA tournament record for three-pointers. Humphrey hit 55 threes in 14 games over his career.
- It was the year of the freshman as Texas' Kevin Durant became the first freshman ever to be named national player of the year. Meanwhile, Ohio State's Greg Oden was an AP first-team All-American, as well as national defensive player of the year.
- Texas Tech coach Bob Knight won his 880th game in a 70–68 win over New Mexico on January 1, 2006. The win moved Knight ahead of Dean Smith for the most career coaching wins in Division I history.
- Florida coach Billy Donovan made headlines as he accepted the Orlando Magic head coaching job, only to return to the Gators.
- Five Duquesne players were shot and injured at an altercation following a campus dance party on September 17, 2006. Coach Ron Everhart drew praise from the media and coaching community as he brought the team together after the tragedy.
- Two players broke the NCAA Division I career free throw percentage record that had been held by Villanova's Gary Buchanan since 2004 (91.3%). Blake Ahearn of Missouri State became the new record-holder, finishing his career with a 94.6%. Derek Raivio of Gonzaga finished second in Division I history at 92.7%.
- Alabama A&M's Mickell Gladness broke the NCAA single-game blocked shot record, swatting 16 shots in a February 24 game against Texas Southern. The previous record had been 14, held by four players.
- The preseason AP All-American team was named on November 8. Tyler Hansbrough of North Carolina was the leading vote-getter (65 of 72 votes). The rest of the team included Joakim Noah of Florida (64 votes), Ronald Steele of Alabama (55), Glen Davis of LSU (51) and Brandon Rush of Kansas (26).
- Wisconsin's Alando Tucker, Boston College's Jared Dudley, Nevada's Nick Fazekas, Albany's Jamar Wilson, Jackson State's Trey Johnson, San Diego State's Brandon Heath, Texas Tech's Jarius Jackson, Hofstra's Loren Stokes, Liberty's Larry Blair, and Towson's Gary Neal (who transferred from La Salle) all eclipsed the career 2000-point mark during the season.
- Oral Roberts had a pair of teammates – Caleb Green and Ken Tutt – both reach the career 2000-point milestone during the season.
- Jackson State's Trey Johnson had the highest single-game scoring output of the season, scoring 49 points in a game against UTEP on December 22, 2006.
- Winston-Salem State and NJIT moved up to Division I competition.
- Conference realignments: Chicago State moved out of the Mid-Continent Conference and became independent. Florida Atlantic moved from the Atlantic Sun Conference to the Sun Belt Conference. Northern Colorado joined the Big Sky Conference after being independent. Central Arkansas and Texas A&M – Corpus Christi joined the Southland Conference. TAMU-CC had been independent while Central Arkansas moved up to division I.
- Kareem Abdul-Jabbar, Austin Carr, Dick Groat, Dick Barnett, Adolph Rupp, Lefty Driesell, Phog Allen, Guy Lewis, John McLendon, Norm Stewart and Vic Bubas were inducted into the College Basketball Hall of Fame.

== Rules changes ==
Beginning in 2006–2007, the following rules changes were implemented:

- Players can no longer call a time out while they are in the air.

== Season outlook ==
=== Pre-season polls ===
The top 25 from the AP and ESPN/USA Today Coaches Polls, November 6, 2006:

Associated Press
Ranking	Team
1	Florida (63)
2	North Carolina (9)
3	Kansas
4	Pittsburgh
5	LSU
6	UCLA
7	Ohio State
8	Georgetown
9	Wisconsin
10	Arizona
11	Alabama
12	Duke
13	Texas A&M
14	Memphis
15	Boston College
16	Marquette
17	Washington
18	Connecticut
19	Creighton
20	Syracuse
21	Texas
22	Kentucky
23	Georgia Tech
24	Nevada
25	Tennessee

ESPN/USA Today coaches
Ranking	Team
1	Florida (30)
2	North Carolina
3	Kansas
4	Ohio State (1)
5	Pittsburgh
5	UCLA
7	LSU
8	Georgetown
9	Wisconsin
10	Arizona
11	Duke
12	Alabama
13	Texas A&M
14	Memphis
15	Boston College
16	Washington
17	Marquette
18	Connecticut
19	Texas
20	Syracuse
21	Georgia Tech
22	Kentucky
23	Creighton
24	Tennessee
25	Nevada

== Conference membership changes ==
These schools joined new conferences for the 2006–07 season.

School	Former conference	New conference
Birmingham–Southern Panthers	Big South Conference	SCAC (D-II)
Central Arkansas Bears	Gulf South Conference (D-II)	Southland Conference
Chicago State Cougars	Mid-Continent Conference	NCAA Division I independent
Florida Atlantic (FAU) Owls	Atlantic Sun Conference	Sun Belt Conference
Louisiana–Monroe Warhawks	Southland Conference	Sun Belt Conference
NJIT Highlanders	CACC (D-II)	NCAA Division I Independent
Northern Colorado Bears	NCAA Division I independent	Big Sky Conference
Texas A&M–Corpus Christi Islanders	NCAA Division I independent	Southland Conference
Winston-Salem State Rams	CIAA (D-II)	NCAA Division I independent

== Regular season ==
=== Conferences ===
==== Conference winners and tournaments ====
Thirty conference seasons concluded with a single-elimination tournament. Generally, all member schools were eligible to participate in their conference tournament regardless of their records, but the Big East did not invite its teams with the worst records to its 2007 tournament. Conference tournament winners received an automatic bid to the 2007 NCAA Division I men's basketball tournament, while a school that won its conference regular season title but did not win its conference tournament was guaranteed a bid to the 2007 National Invitation Tournament unless it received an at-large bid to the NCAA tournament. The Ivy League was the only NCAA Division I conference that did not hold a conference tournament, instead sending its regular-season champion to the NCAA tournament.

Conference	Regular season winner	Conference player of the year	Conference tournament	Tournament venue (city)	Tournament winner
America East Conference	Vermont	Jamar Wilson, Albany	2007 America East men's basketball tournament	Agganis Arena (Boston, Massachusetts) (except Finals)	Albany
Atlantic 10 Conference	Xavier & Massachusetts	Stéphane Lasme, Massachusetts	2007 Atlantic 10 men's basketball tournament	Boardwalk Hall (Atlantic City, New Jersey)	George Washington
Atlantic Coast Conference	North Carolina & Virginia	Jared Dudley, Boston College	2007 ACC men's basketball tournament	St. Pete Times Forum (Tampa, Florida)	North Carolina
Atlantic Sun Conference	East Tennessee State	Courtney Pigram, East Tennessee State	2007 Atlantic Sun men's basketball tournament	Memorial Center (Johnson City, Tennessee)	Belmont
Big 12 Conference	Kansas	Kevin Durant, Texas	2007 Big 12 men's basketball tournament	Ford Center (Oklahoma City, Oklahoma)	Kansas
Big East Conference	Georgetown	Jeff Green, Georgetown	2007 Big East men's basketball tournament	Madison Square Garden (New York City)	Georgetown
Big Sky Conference	Weber State & Northern Arizona	David Patten, Weber State	2007 Big Sky Conference men's basketball tournament	Dee Events Center (Ogden, Utah) (Semifinals and Finals)	Weber State
Big South Conference	Winthrop	Arizona Reid, High Point	2007 Big South Conference men's basketball tournament	Campus Sites	Winthrop
Big Ten Conference	Ohio State	Alando Tucker, Wisconsin	2007 Big Ten Conference men's basketball tournament	United Center (Chicago, Illinois)	Ohio State
Big West Conference	Long Beach State	Aaron Nixon, Long Beach State	2007 Big West Conference men's basketball tournament	Anaheim Convention Center (Anaheim, California)	Long Beach State
Colonial Athletic Association	VCU	Loren Stokes, Hofstra	2007 CAA men's basketball tournament	Richmond Coliseum (Richmond, Virginia)	VCU
Conference USA	Memphis	Morris Almond, Rice	2007 Conference USA men's basketball tournament	FedExForum (Memphis, Tennessee)	Memphis
Horizon League	Butler & Wright State	DaShaun Wood, Wright State	2007 Horizon League men's basketball tournament	Nutter Center (Dayton, Ohio) (except first round)	Wright State
Ivy League	Penn	Ibrahim Jaaber, Penn	No tournament		
Metro Atlantic Athletic Conference	Marist	Jared Jordan, Marist	2007 MAAC men's basketball tournament	Arena at Harbor Yard (Bridgeport, Connecticut)	Niagara
Mid-American Conference	Akron (East); Toledo (West)	Romeo Travis, Akron	2007 MAC men's basketball tournament	Quicken Loans Arena (Cleveland, Ohio)	Miami (OH)
Mid-Continent Conference	Oral Roberts	Caleb Green, Oral Roberts	2007 Mid-Continent Conference men's basketball tournament	John Q. Hammons Arena (Tulsa, Oklahoma)	Oral Roberts
Mid-Eastern Athletic Conference	Delaware State	Jahsha Bluntt, Delaware State	2007 MEAC men's basketball tournament	RBC Center (Raleigh, North Carolina)	Florida A&M
Missouri Valley Conference	Southern Illinois	Jamaal Tatum, Southern Illinois	2007 Missouri Valley Conference men's basketball tournament	Scottrade Center (St. Louis, Missouri)	Creighton
Mountain West Conference	BYU	Keena Young, BYU	2007 MWC men's basketball tournament	Thomas & Mack Center (Las Vegas, Nevada)	UNLV
Northeast Conference	Central Connecticut State	Javier Mojica, Central Connecticut State	2007 Northeast Conference men's basketball tournament	Campus Sites	Central Connecticut State
Ohio Valley Conference	Austin Peay	Drake Reed, Austin Peay	2007 Ohio Valley Conference men's basketball tournament	Gaylord Entertainment Center (Nashville, Tennessee)	Eastern Kentucky
Pacific-10 Conference	UCLA	Arron Afflalo, UCLA	2007 Pacific-10 Conference men's basketball tournament	Staples Center (Los Angeles)	Oregon
Patriot League	Holy Cross & Bucknell	Keith Simmons, Holy Cross	2007 Patriot League men's basketball tournament	Campus Sites	Holy Cross
Southeastern Conference	Florida (East); Mississippi & Mississippi State (West)	Derrick Byars, Vanderbilt (Coaches); Chris Lofton, Tennessee (AP)	2007 SEC men's basketball tournament	Georgia Dome (Atlanta, Georgia)	Florida
Southern Conference	Appalachian State (North); Davidson (South)	Kyle Hines, UNC Greensboro	2007 Southern Conference men's basketball tournament	North Charleston Coliseum (North Charleston, South Carolina)	Davidson
Southland Conference	Northwestern State (East); Texas A&M – CC (West)	Chris Daniels, Texas A&M – CC	2007 Southland Conference men's basketball tournament	Campbell Center (Houston, Texas)	Texas A&M – CC
Southwestern Athletic Conference	Mississippi Valley State	Trey Johnson, Jackson State	2007 SWAC men's basketball tournament	Birmingham Jefferson Convention Complex (Birmingham, Alabama)	Jackson State
Sun Belt Conference	South Alabama (East); Arkansas State & Louisiana–Monroe (West)	Bo McCalebb, New Orleans	2007 Sun Belt men's basketball tournament	Cajundome (Lafayette, Louisiana)	North Texas
West Coast Conference	Gonzaga	Derek Raivio, Gonzaga & Sean Denison, Santa Clara	2007 West Coast Conference men's basketball tournament	Chiles Center (Portland, Oregon)	Gonzaga
Western Athletic Conference	Nevada	Nick Fazekas, Nevada	2007 WAC men's basketball tournament	Pan American Center (Las Cruces, New Mexico)	New Mexico State

==== Conference standings ====
2006–07 America East men's basketball standings
	Conf.				Overall
Team	W		L	PCT	W		L	PCT
Vermont	15	–	1	.938	25	–	8	.758
Albany †	13	–	3	.813	23	–	10	.697
Boston University	8	–	8	.500	12	–	18	.400
Maine	7	–	9	.438	12	–	18	.400
UMBC	7	–	9	.438	12	–	19	.387
Binghamton	6	–	10	.375	13	–	16	.448
New Hampshire	6	–	10	.375	10	–	20	.333
Hartford	6	–	10	.375	13	–	18	.419
Stony Brook	4	–	12	.250	9	–	20	.310
† America East tournament winner As of March 13, 2007; Rankings from AP Poll

2006–07 Atlantic 10 men's basketball standings
	Conf.				Overall
Team	W		L	PCT	W		L	PCT
Xavier	13	–	3	.813	25	–	9	.735
UMass	13	–	3	.813	24	–	9	.727
George Washington †	11	–	5	.688	23	–	9	.719
Fordham	10	–	6	.625	18	–	12	.600
Rhode Island	10	–	6	.625	19	–	14	.576
Saint Joseph's	9	–	7	.563	18	–	14	.563
Dayton	8	–	8	.500	19	–	12	.613
Saint Louis	8	–	8	.500	20	–	13	.606
Charlotte	7	–	9	.438	14	–	16	.467
Temple	6	–	10	.375	12	–	18	.400
Duquesne	6	–	10	.375	10	–	19	.345
Richmond	4	–	12	.250	8	–	22	.267
St. Bonaventure	4	–	12	.250	7	–	22	.241
La Salle	3	–	13	.188	10	–	20	.333
† 2007 Atlantic 10 Tournament winner Rankings from AP Poll

2006–07 ACC men's basketball standings
	Conf.				Overall
Team	W		L	PCT	W		L	PCT
No. 4 North Carolina†	11	–	5	.688	31	–	7	.816
Virginia	11	–	5	.688	21	–	11	.656
Virginia Tech	10	–	6	.625	22	–	12	.647
Boston College	10	–	6	.625	21	–	12	.636
No. 18 Maryland	10	–	6	.625	25	–	9	.735
Georgia Tech	8	–	8	.500	20	–	12	.625
Duke	8	–	8	.500	22	–	11	.667
Clemson	7	–	9	.438	25	–	11	.694
Florida State	7	–	9	.438	22	–	13	.629
NC State	5	–	11	.313	20	–	16	.556
Wake Forest	5	–	11	.313	15	–	16	.484
Miami (FL)	4	–	12	.250	12	–	20	.375
† 2007 ACC tournament winner Rankings from AP Poll

2006–07 Atlantic Sun men's basketball standings
	Conf.				Overall
Team	W		L	PCT	W		L	PCT
East Tennessee State	16	–	2	.889	24	–	10	.706
Belmont †	14	–	4	.778	23	–	10	.697
Lipscomb	11	–	7	.611	18	–	13	.581
Jacksonville	11	–	7	.611	15	–	14	.517
Kennesaw State	9	–	9	.500	13	–	18	.419
Mercer	8	–	10	.444	13	–	17	.433
Campbell	7	–	11	.389	14	–	17	.452
Gardner–Webb	7	–	11	.389	9	–	21	.300
Stetson	6	–	12	.333	11	–	20	.355
North Florida	1	–	17	.056	3	–	26	.103
† 2007 Atlantic Sun Tournament winner As of March 6, 2007; Rankings from AP Poll

2006–07 Big East men's basketball standings
	Conf.				Overall
Team	W		L	PCT	W		L	PCT
No. 8 Georgetown †	13	–	3	.813	30	–	7	.811
No. 16 Louisville	12	–	4	.750	24	–	10	.706
No. 12 Pittsburgh	12	–	4	.750	29	–	8	.784
No. 17 Notre Dame	11	–	5	.688	24	–	8	.750
No. 20 Marquette	10	–	6	.625	24	–	10	.706
West Virginia	9	–	7	.563	27	–	9	.750
DePaul	9	–	7	.563	20	–	14	.588
Villanova	9	–	7	.563	22	–	11	.667
Providence	8	–	8	.500	18	–	13	.581
St. John's	7	–	9	.438	16	–	15	.516
Connecticut	6	–	10	.375	17	–	14	.548
*Seton Hall	4	–	12	.250	13	–	16	.448
*South Florida	3	–	13	.188	12	–	18	.400
*Rutgers	3	–	13	.188	10	–	19	.345
*Cincinnati	2	–	14	.125	11	–	19	.367
**Syracuse	0	–	6	.000	2	–	11	.154
† 2007 Big East tournament winner As of April 2, 2007; Rankings from AP Poll; *Did not qualify for 2007 Big East tournament **Syracuse had 22 regular season games and two postseason games vacated due to sanctions against the program; Syracuse′s disputed record was 10–6, 24–11.

2006–07 Big Sky men's basketball standings
	Conf.				Overall
Team	W		L	PCT	W		L	PCT
Weber State †	11	–	5	.688	20	–	12	.625
Northern Arizona	11	–	5	.688	18	–	12	.600
Montana	10	–	6	.625	17	–	15	.531
Portland State	9	–	7	.563	19	–	13	.594
Montana State	8	–	8	.500	11	–	19	.367
Idaho State	8	–	8	.500	13	–	17	.433
Eastern Washington	8	–	8	.500	15	–	14	.517
Sacramento State	5	–	11	.313	10	–	19	.345
Northern Colorado	2	–	14	.125	4	–	24	.143
† 2007 Big Sky tournament winner Rankings from AP Poll

2006–07 Big South Conference men's basketball standings
	Conf.				Overall
Team	W		L	PCT	W		L	PCT
No. 22 Winthrop †	14	–	0	1.000	29	–	5	.853
High Point	11	–	3	.786	22	–	10	.688
Liberty	8	–	6	.571	14	–	17	.452
UNC Asheville	6	–	8	.429	12	–	19	.387
Coastal Carolina	7	–	7	.500	15	–	15	.500
VMI	5	–	9	.357	14	–	19	.424
Radford	3	–	11	.214	8	–	22	.267
Charleston Southern	2	–	12	.143	8	–	22	.267
† 2007 Big South tournament winner Rankings from AP Poll

2006–07 Big Ten Conference men's basketball standings
	Conf.				Overall
Team	W		L	PCT	W		L	PCT
No. 1 Ohio State†	15	–	1	.938	35	–	4	.897
No. 6 Wisconsin	13	–	3	.813	30	–	6	.833
Indiana	10	–	6	.625	21	–	11	.656
Iowa	9	–	7	.563	17	–	14	.548
Purdue	9	–	7	.563	22	–	12	.647
Illinois	9	–	7	.563	23	–	12	.657
Michigan State	8	–	8	.500	23	–	12	.657
Michigan	8	–	8	.500	22	–	13	.629
Minnesota	3	–	13	.188	9	–	22	.290
Penn State	2	–	14	.125	13	–	18	.419
Northwestern	2	–	14	.125	11	–	19	.367
† 2007 Big Ten tournament winner As of March 13, 2007; Rankings from AP Poll

2006–07 Big 12 men's basketball standings
	Conf.				Overall
Team	W		L	PCT	W		L	PCT
No. 2 Kansas †	14	–	2	.875	33	–	5	.868
No. 9 Texas A&M	13	–	3	.813	27	–	7	.794
No. 11 Texas	12	–	4	.750	25	–	10	.714
Kansas State	10	–	6	.625	23	–	12	.657
Texas Tech	9	–	7	.563	21	–	13	.618
Missouri	7	–	9	.438	18	–	12	.600
Oklahoma State	6	–	10	.375	22	–	13	.629
Iowa State	6	–	10	.375	15	–	16	.484
Oklahoma	6	–	10	.375	16	–	15	.516
Nebraska	6	–	10	.375	17	–	14	.548
Baylor	4	–	12	.250	15	–	16	.484
Colorado	3	–	13	.188	7	–	20	.259
† 2007 Big 12 Tournament winner Rankings from AP poll

2006–07 Big West men's basketball standings
	Conf.				Overall
Team	W		L	PCT	W		L	PCT
Long Beach State†	12	–	2	.857	24	–	8	.750
Cal State Fullerton	9	–	5	.643	20	–	10	.667
Cal Poly	9	–	5	.643	19	–	11	.633
UC Santa Barbara	9	–	5	.643	18	–	11	.621
UC Irvine	6	–	8	.429	15	–	18	.455
Cal State Northridge	5	–	9	.357	14	–	17	.452
Pacific	5	–	9	.357	12	–	19	.387
UC Riverside	1	–	13	.071	7	–	24	.226
† 2007 Big West tournament winner As of April 10, 2007; Rankings from AP poll

2006–07 CAA men's basketball standings
	Conf.				Overall
Team	W		L	PCT	W		L	PCT
VCU†	16	–	2	.889	28	–	7	.800
Old Dominion	15	–	3	.833	24	–	9	.727
Hofstra	13	–	5	.722	23	–	9	.719
Drexel	13	–	5	.722	23	–	9	.719
George Mason	9	–	9	.500	18	–	15	.545
Northeastern	9	–	9	.500	13	–	19	.406
Towson	8	–	10	.444	15	–	17	.469
William & Mary	5	–	13	.278	11	–	20	.355
Georgia State	5	–	13	.278	9	–	21	.300
UNC Wilmington	4	–	14	.222	7	–	22	.241
James Madison	4	–	14	.222	7	–	23	.233
Delaware	3	–	15	.167	5	–	26	.161
† 2007 CAA tournament winner Rankings from AP poll

2006–07 Conference USA men's basketball standings
	Conf.				Overall
Team	W		L	PCT	W		L	PCT
No. 5 Memphis†	16	–	0	1.000	33	–	4	.892
UCF	11	–	5	.688	22	–	9	.710
Houston	10	–	6	.625	18	–	15	.545
Southern Miss	9	–	7	.563	20	–	11	.645
Tulsa	9	–	7	.563	20	–	11	.645
Tulane	9	–	7	.563	17	–	13	.567
Rice	8	–	8	.500	16	–	16	.500
UAB	7	–	9	.438	15	–	16	.484
Marshall	7	–	9	.438	13	–	19	.406
UTEP	6	–	10	.375	14	–	17	.452
SMU	3	–	13	.188	14	–	17	.452
East Carolina	1	–	15	.063	6	–	24	.200
† 2007 C-USA Tournament winner Rankings from AP Poll

2006–07 Horizon League men's basketball standings
	Conf.				Overall
Team	W		L	PCT	W		L	PCT
No. 21 Butler	13	–	3	.813	29	–	7	.806
Wright State †	13	–	3	.813	23	–	10	.697
Loyola (IL)	10	–	6	.625	21	–	11	.656
Green Bay	7	–	9	.438	18	–	15	.545
Youngstown State	7	–	9	.438	14	–	17	.452
UIC	7	–	9	.438	14	–	18	.438
Detroit	6	–	10	.375	11	–	19	.367
Milwaukee	6	–	10	.375	9	–	22	.290
Cleveland State	3	–	13	.188	10	–	21	.323
† 2007 Horizon League Tournament winner As of August 1, 2010; Rankings from AP Poll

2006–07 Ivy League men's basketball standings
	Conf.				Overall
Team	W		L	PCT	W		L	PCT
Penn	13	–	1	.929	22	–	9	.710
Yale	10	–	4	.714	14	–	13	.519
Cornell	9	–	5	.643	16	–	12	.571
Columbia	7	–	7	.500	16	–	12	.571
Brown	6	–	8	.429	11	–	18	.379
Harvard	5	–	9	.357	12	–	16	.429
Dartmouth	3	–	11	.214	10	–	18	.357
Princeton	2	–	12	.143	11	–	17	.393

2006–07 MAAC men's basketball standings
	Conf.				Overall
Team	W		L	PCT	W		L	PCT
Marist	14	–	4	.778	25	–	9	.735
Niagara †	13	–	5	.722	23	–	12	.657
Loyola (MD)	12	–	6	.667	18	–	13	.581
Siena	12	–	6	.667	20	–	12	.625
Manhattan	10	–	8	.556	13	–	17	.433
Fairfield	10	–	8	.556	13	–	19	.406
Rider	9	–	9	.500	16	–	15	.516
Canisius	6	–	12	.333	12	–	19	.387
Saint Peter's	3	–	15	.167	5	–	25	.167
Iona	1	–	17	.056	2	–	28	.067
† 2007 MAAC tournament winner Rankings from AP Poll

2006–07 Mid-American Conference men's basketball standings
	Conf.				Overall
Team	W		L	PCT	W		L	PCT
East
Akron	13	–	3	.813	26	–	7	.788
Kent State	12	–	4	.750	21	–	11	.656
Miami (OH) †	10	–	6	.625	18	–	15	.545
Ohio	9	–	7	.563	19	–	13	.594
Buffalo	4	–	12	.250	12	–	19	.387
Bowling Green	3	–	13	.188	13	–	18	.419
West
Toledo	14	–	2	.875	19	–	13	.594
Western Michigan	9	–	7	.563	16	–	16	.500
Central Michigan	7	–	9	.438	13	–	18	.419
Eastern Michigan	6	–	10	.375	13	–	19	.406
Ball State	5	–	11	.313	9	–	22	.290
Northern Illinois	4	–	12	.250	7	–	23	.233
† 2007 MAC tournament winner Rankings from AP Poll

2006–07 Mid-Continent Conference men's basketball standings
	Conf.				Overall
Team	W		L	PCT	W		L	PCT
Oral Roberts †	12	–	2	.857	23	–	11	.676
Oakland	10	–	4	.714	19	–	14	.576
Valparaiso	9	–	5	.643	16	–	15	.516
IUPUI	7	–	7	.500	15	–	15	.500
Southern Utah	6	–	8	.429	16	–	14	.533
UMKC	6	–	8	.429	12	–	20	.375
Western Illinois	3	–	11	.214	7	–	23	.233
Centenary	3	–	11	.214	10	–	21	.323
† 2007 Mid-Continent Tournament winner Rankings from AP Poll

2006–07 MEAC men's basketball standings
	Conf.				Overall
Team	W		L	PCT	W		L	PCT
Delaware State	16	–	2	.889	21	–	13	.618
Florida A&M †	12	–	6	.667	21	–	14	.600
Hampton	10	–	8	.556	15	–	16	.484
North Carolina A&T	10	–	8	.556	15	–	17	.469
South Carolina State	10	–	8	.556	13	–	17	.433
Morgan State	10	–	8	.556	13	–	18	.419
Norfolk State	10	–	8	.556	11	–	19	.367
Coppin State	9	–	9	.500	12	–	20	.375
Bethune–Cookman	6	–	12	.333	9	–	21	.300
Howard	5	–	13	.278	9	–	22	.290
Maryland Eastern Shore	1	–	17	.056	4	–	27	.129
† 2007 MEAC tournament winner

2006–07 Missouri Valley Conference men's basketball standings
	Conf.				Overall
Team	W		L	PCT	W		L	PCT
No. 14 Southern Illinois	15	–	3	.833	29	–	7	.806
Creighton †	13	–	5	.722	22	–	11	.667
Missouri State	12	–	6	.667	22	–	11	.667
Bradley	10	–	8	.556	22	–	13	.629
Northern Iowa	9	–	9	.500	18	–	13	.581
Wichita State	8	–	10	.444	17	–	14	.548
Illinois State	6	–	12	.333	15	–	16	.484
Evansville	6	–	12	.333	14	–	17	.452
Drake	6	–	12	.333	17	–	15	.531
Indiana State	5	–	13	.278	13	–	18	.419
† 2007 MVC tournament winner Rankings from AP poll

2006–07 Mountain West Conference men's basketball standings
	Conf.				Overall
Team	W		L	PCT	W		L	PCT
No. 24 BYU	13	–	3	.813	25	–	9	.735
No. 19 UNLV †	12	–	4	.750	30	–	7	.811
San Diego State	10	–	6	.625	22	–	11	.667
Air Force	10	–	6	.625	26	–	9	.743
Wyoming	7	–	9	.438	17	–	15	.531
Colorado State	6	–	10	.375	17	–	13	.567
Utah	6	–	10	.375	11	–	19	.367
TCU	4	–	12	.250	13	–	17	.433
New Mexico	4	–	12	.250	15	–	17	.469
† 2007 Mountain West tournament winner Rankings from AP Poll

2006–07 Northeast Conference men's basketball standings
	Conf.				Overall
Team	W		L	PCT	W		L	PCT
Central Connecticut †	16	–	2	.889	22	–	12	.647
Sacred Heart	12	–	6	.667	18	–	14	.563
Quinnipiac	11	–	7	.611	14	–	15	.483
Robert Morris	9	–	9	.500	17	–	11	.607
Mount St. Mary's	9	–	9	.500	11	–	20	.355
Fairleigh Dickinson	9	–	9	.500	14	–	16	.467
Wagner	8	–	10	.444	11	–	19	.367
St. Francis (NY)	7	–	11	.389	9	–	22	.290
Monmouth	7	–	11	.389	12	–	18	.400
Long Island	6	–	12	.333	10	–	19	.345
Saint Francis (PA)	5	–	13	.278	8	–	21	.276
† 2007 NEC tournament winner

2006–07 Ohio Valley Conference men's basketball standings
	Conf.				Overall
Team	W		L	PCT	W		L	PCT
Austin Peay	16	–	4	.800	21	–	12	.636
Eastern Kentucky †	13	–	7	.650	21	–	12	.636
Tennessee Tech	13	–	7	.650	19	–	13	.594
Murray State	13	–	7	.650	16	–	14	.533
Samford	12	–	8	.600	16	–	16	.500
Southeast Missouri State	9	–	11	.450	11	–	20	.355
Morehead State	8	–	12	.400	12	–	18	.400
Tennessee State	8	–	12	.400	12	–	20	.375
Jacksonville State	7	–	13	.350	9	–	22	.290
Eastern Illinois	6	–	14	.300	10	–	20	.333
UT Martin	5	–	15	.250	8	–	23	.258
† 2007 Ohio Valley Conference tournament winner Rankings from AP Poll

2006–07 Pacific-10 Conference men's basketball standings
	Conf.				Overall
Team	W		L	PCT	W		L	PCT
No. 7 UCLA	15	–	3	.833	30	–	6	.833
No. 13 Washington State	13	–	5	.722	26	–	8	.765
No. 23 USC^{1}	11	–	7	.611	25	–	12	.676
No. 10 Oregon†^{2}	11	–	7	.611	29	–	8	.784
Arizona	11	–	7	.611	20	–	11	.645
Stanford	10	–	8	.556	18	–	13	.581
Washington	8	–	10	.444	19	–	13	.594
California	6	–	12	.333	16	–	17	.485
Oregon State	3	–	15	.167	11	–	21	.344
Arizona State	2	–	16	.111	8	–	22	.267
† Conference tournament winner As of March 18, 2007; Rankings from AP poll^{1} Holds tie-breaker, ^{2} Holds second tie-breaker.

2006–07 Patriot League men's basketball standings
	Conf.				Overall
Team	W		L	PCT	W		L	PCT
Holy Cross †	13	–	1	.929	25	–	9	.735
Bucknell	13	–	1	.929	22	–	9	.710
Lehigh	7	–	7	.500	12	–	19	.387
American	7	–	7	.500	16	–	14	.533
Colgate	5	–	9	.357	10	–	19	.345
Army	4	–	10	.286	15	–	16	.484
Navy	4	–	10	.286	14	–	16	.467
Lafayette	3	–	11	.214	9	–	21	.300
† 2007 Patriot League tournament winner

2006–07 Southeastern Conference men's basketball standings
	Conf.				Overall
Team	W		L	PCT	W		L	PCT
East
No. 3 Florida †	13	–	3	.813	35	–	5	.875
Vanderbilt	10	–	6	.625	22	–	12	.647
No. 25 Tennessee	10	–	6	.625	24	–	11	.686
Kentucky	9	–	7	.563	22	–	12	.647
Georgia	8	–	8	.500	19	–	14	.576
South Carolina	4	–	12	.250	14	–	16	.467
West
Mississippi State	8	–	8	.500	21	–	13	.618
Ole Miss	8	–	8	.500	21	–	14	.600
Arkansas	7	–	9	.438	21	–	14	.600
Auburn	7	–	9	.438	17	–	14	.548
Alabama	7	–	9	.438	20	–	12	.625
LSU	5	–	11	.313	17	–	15	.531
† 2007 SEC tournament winner Rankings from AP Poll

2006–07 Southern Conference men's basketball standings
	Conf.				Overall
Team	W		L	PCT	W		L	PCT
North
Appalachian State	15	–	3	.833	25	–	8	.758
UNC Greensboro	12	–	6	.667	16	–	14	.533
Western Carolina	7	–	11	.389	11	–	20	.355
Chattanooga	6	–	12	.333	15	–	18	.455
Elon	5	–	13	.278	7	–	23	.233
South
Davidson†	17	–	1	.944	29	–	5	.853
College of Charleston	13	–	5	.722	22	–	11	.667
Furman	8	–	10	.444	15	–	16	.484
Georgia Southern	7	–	11	.389	15	–	16	.484
Wofford	5	–	13	.278	10	–	20	.333
The Citadel	4	–	14	.222	7	–	23	.233
† SoCon Tournament winner As of April 30, 2007; Rankings from AP poll

2006–07 Southland Conference men's basketball standings
	Conf.				Overall
Team	W		L	PCT	W		L	PCT
East
Northwestern State	10	–	6	.625	17	–	15	.531
McNeese State	9	–	7	.563	15	–	17	.469
Southeastern Louisiana	8	–	8	.500	16	–	14	.533
Lamar	8	–	8	.500	15	–	17	.469
Nicholls State	7	–	9	.438	8	–	22	.267
Central Arkansas	4	–	12	.250	10	–	20	.333
West
Texas A&M–Corpus Christi †	14	–	2	.875	26	–	7	.788
Sam Houston State	13	–	3	.813	21	–	10	.677
Stephen F. Austin	8	–	8	.500	15	–	14	.517
Texas-Arlington	8	–	8	.500	13	–	17	.433
Texas State	4	–	12	.250	9	–	20	.310
UTSA	3	–	13	.188	7	–	22	.241
† 2007 Southland Conference tournament winner Rankings from AP Poll

2006–07 SWAC men's basketball standings
	Conf.				Overall
Team	W		L	PCT	W		L	PCT
Mississippi Valley State	13	–	5	.722	18	–	16	.529
Jackson State †	12	–	6	.667	21	–	14	.600
Grambling State	10	–	8	.556	12	–	14	.462
Alcorn State	10	–	8	.556	11	–	19	.367
Texas Southern	9	–	9	.500	14	–	17	.452
Arkansas–Pine Bluff	9	–	9	.500	12	–	19	.387
Southern	9	–	9	.500	10	–	21	.323
Alabama State	8	–	10	.444	10	–	20	.333
Prairie View A&M	6	–	12	.333	8	–	22	.267
Alabama A&M	4	–	14	.222	10	–	20	.333
† 2007 SWAC tournament winner Rankings from AP Poll

2006–07 Sun Belt Conference men's basketball standings
	Conf.				Overall
Team	W		L	PCT	W		L	PCT
East
South Alabama	13	–	5	.722	20	–	12	.625
Western Kentucky	12	–	6	.667	22	–	11	.667
Florida Atlantic	10	–	8	.556	16	–	15	.516
Troy	8	–	10	.444	13	–	17	.433
Middle Tennessee	8	–	10	.444	15	–	17	.469
Florida International	7	–	11	.389	12	–	17	.414
West
Arkansas State	11	–	7	.611	18	–	15	.545
Louisiana–Monroe	11	–	7	.611	18	–	14	.563
North Texas †	10	–	8	.556	23	–	11	.676
New Orleans	9	–	9	.500	14	–	17	.452
Arkansas-Little Rock	8	–	10	.444	13	–	17	.433
Louisiana–Lafayette	7	–	11	.389	9	–	21	.300
Denver	3	–	15	.167	4	–	25	.138
† 2007 Sun Belt Conference tournament winner Rankings from AP Poll

2006–07 WAC men's basketball standings
	Conf.				Overall
Team	W		L	PCT	W		L	PCT
No. 15 Nevada	14	–	2	.875	29	–	5	.853
New Mexico State †	11	–	5	.688	25	–	9	.735
Fresno State	10	–	6	.625	22	–	10	.688
Utah State	9	–	7	.563	23	–	12	.657
Hawaii	8	–	8	.500	18	–	13	.581
Boise State	8	–	8	.500	17	–	14	.548
Louisiana Tech	7	–	9	.438	10	–	20	.333
San Jose State	4	–	12	.250	5	–	25	.167
Idaho	1	–	15	.063	4	–	27	.129
† 2007 WAC tournament winner Rankings from AP poll

2006–07 West Coast Conference men's basketball standings
	Conf.				Overall
Team	W		L	PCT	W		L	PCT
Gonzaga †	11	–	3	.786	23	–	11	.676
Santa Clara	10	–	4	.714	21	–	10	.677
Saint Mary's	8	–	6	.571	17	–	15	.531
San Francisco	8	–	6	.571	13	–	18	.419
San Diego	6	–	8	.429	18	–	14	.563
Loyola Marymount	5	–	9	.357	13	–	18	.419
Portland	4	–	10	.286	9	–	23	.281
Pepperdine	4	–	10	.286	8	–	23	.258
† 2007 WCC tournament winner Rankings from AP Poll

=== Division I independents ===
Eleven schools played as Division I independents. Only Chicago State, IPFW, Savannah State, and Texas–Pan American were considered full NCAA Division I schools, as the rest were still in a transition phase from NCAA Division II.

2006–07 NCAA Division I men's basketball independents standings
	Conf.				Overall
Team	W		L	PCT	W		L	PCT
Utah Valley State		–		–	22	–	7	.759
North Dakota State		–		–	20	–	8	.714
Texas–Pan American		–		–	14	–	15	.483
IPFW		–		–	12	–	17	.414
Savannah State		–		–	12	–	18	.400
Chicago State		–		–	9	–	20	.310
Longwood		–		–	9	–	22	.290
South Dakota State		–		–	6	–	24	.200
UC Davis		–		–	5	–	23	.179
NJIT		–		–	5	–	24	.172
Winston–Salem State		–		–	5	–	24	.172
Rankings from AP Poll

=== Informal championships ===
Conference	Regular season winner	Most Valuable Player
Philadelphia Big 5	Villanova	Ibrahim Jaaber, Penn

Villanova finished with a 4–0 record in head-to-head competition among the Philadelphia Big 5.

=== Major upsets ===
==== Regular season and conference tournaments ====
Date played	Winning team		Losing team	
November 15	Oral Roberts	78	Kansas	71
November 19	Old Dominion	75	Georgetown	62
November 17	Colorado-Colorado Springs	96	Northern Colorado	91

=== Key games ===
Date played	Winning team		Losing team	
November 25	Kansas	82	Florida	80
December 21	Oklahoma State	95	Pittsburgh	89 (2OT)
February 25	Ohio State	49	Wisconsin	48

=== Statistical leaders ===
Source for additional stats categories

Points per game			Rebounds per game			Assists per game			Steals per game		
Player	School	PPG	Player	School	RPG	Player	School	APG	Player	School	SPG
Reggie Williams	VMI	28.1	Rashad Jones-Jennings	UALR	13.1	Jared Jordan	Marist	8.7	Travis Holmes	VMI	3.4
Trey Johnson	Jackson State	27.1	Chris Holm	Vermont	12.2	Jason Richards	Davidson	7.3	Paul Gause	Seton Hall	3.1
Morris Almond	Rice	26.4	Kantrell Gransberry	South Florida	11.4	Mustafa Shakur	Arizona	6.9	Ledell Eackles	Campbell	3.0
Kevin Durant	Texas	25.8	Kevin Durant	Texas	11.1	D. J. Augustin	Texas	6.7	Ibrahim Jaaber	Penn	2.8
Gary Neal	Towson	25.3	Nick Fazekas	Nevada	11.1	Eric Maynor	VCU	6.4	Chavis Holmes	VMI	2.8

Blocked shots per game			Field goal percentage			Three-point FG percentage			Free throw percentage		
Player	School	BPG	Player	School	FG%	Player	School	3FG%	Player	School	FT%
Mickell Gladness	Alabama A&M	6.3	Mike Freeman	Hampton	67.8	Josh Carter	Texas A&M	50.0	Derek Raivio	Gonzaga	96.1
Stéphane Lasme	UMass	5.1	Roy Hibbert	Georgetown	67.1	Jeremy Crouch	Bradley	50.0	A. J. Graves	Butler	94.8
Hasheem Thabeet	UConn	3.8	Florencio Valencia	Toledo	66.7	Stephen Sir	N. Arizona	49.0	Blake Ahearn	Missouri St.	92.5
McHugh Mattis	S. Florida	3.6	Vladimir Kuljanin	UNC Wilmington	66.3	Jimmy Baron	Rhode Island	47.8	Tristan Blackwood	C. Conn. St.	92.4
Dominic McGuire	Fresno St.	3.6	Calvin Brown	Norfolk St.	65.2	Josh Washington	TAMU-CC	47.6	David Kool	W. Michigan	91.7

== Post-season tournaments ==
=== NCAA tournament ===
The NCAA Tournament tipped off on March 13, 2007, with the opening round game in Dayton, Ohio, and concluded on April 2 at the Georgia Dome in Atlanta, Georgia. A total of 65 teams entered the tournament. Thirty of the teams earned automatic bids by winning their conference tournaments. The automatic bid of the Ivy League, which does not conduct a post-season tournament, went to its regular season champion. The remaining 34 teams were granted "at-large" bids, which are extended by the NCAA Selection Committee. The Atlantic Coast Conference led the way with seven bids, while the Big East, Big Ten and Pac-10 each placed six teams in the field. Florida successfully defended their title, beating Ohio State 84–75 in the final and becoming the first team since the 1991–92 Duke Blue Devils to repeat as champions. Florida swingman Corey Brewer was named the tournament's Most Outstanding Player, while guard Lee Humphrey broke the career NCAA Tournament record for three-pointers made.

==== Final Four – Georgia Dome, Atlanta, Georgia ====
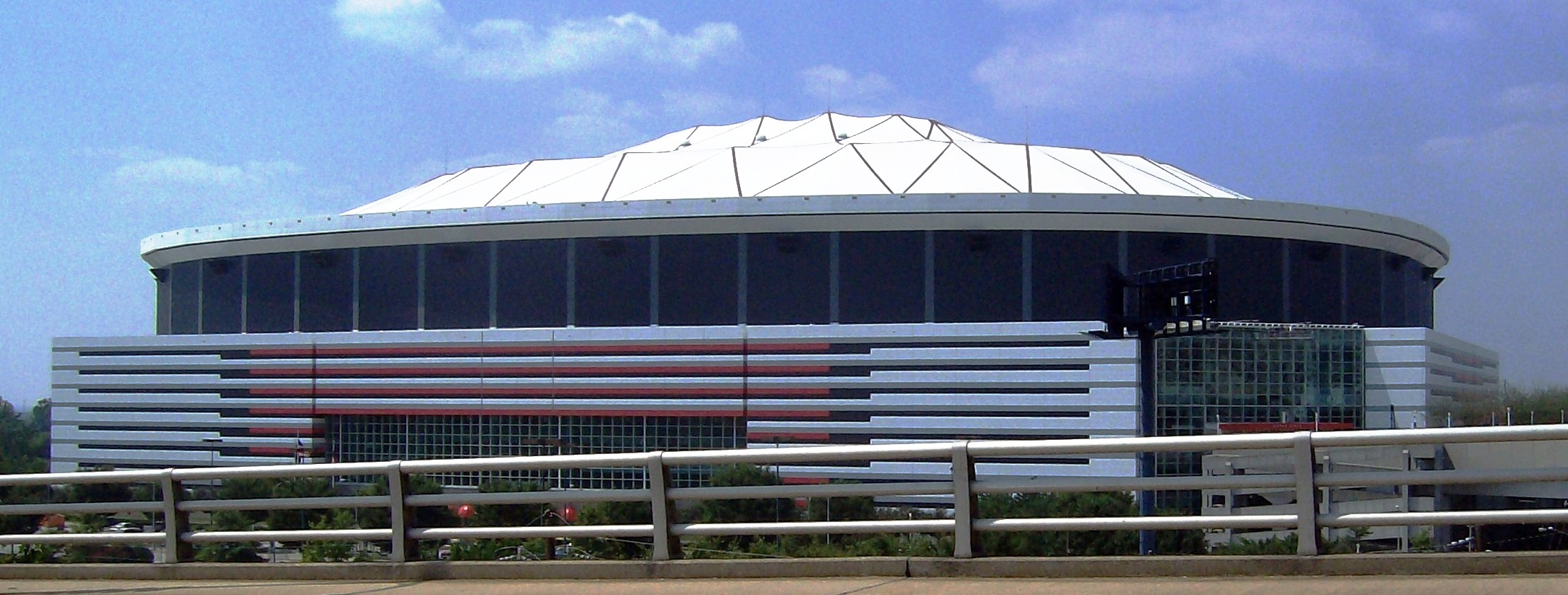
The Georgia Dome was the site of the Final Four and Championship game to end the 2006–07 season.

National Semifinals; March 31
M1	Florida	76
W2	UCLA	66
E2	Georgetown	60
S1	Ohio State	67

National Championship; April 2
M1	Florida	84
S1	Ohio State	75

=== National Invitation tournament ===
After the NCAA Tournament field was announced, the National Invitation Tournament invited 32 teams to participate, reducing the field's size from 40. Eight teams were given automatic bids for winning their conference regular seasons, and 24 other teams were also invited. The field came from 18 conferences, with the Big East and Southeastern Conference tying for the most teams invited with four. For the first time since the NIT began seeding teams, all four No. 1 seeds reached the final four. John Beilein's West Virginia Mountaineers won the title, defeating the Oliver Purnell-coached Clemson Tigers 78–73 in the championship game. The Mountaineers reached the championship game after Darris Nichols' dramatic 3-pointer at the buzzer stunned Mississippi State in the semifinals. Mountaineer guard Frank Young was named tournament MVP.

==== Semifinals and finals ====
Semifinals
1	West Virginia	63
1	Mississippi State	62
1	Clemson	68
1	Air Force	67

Finals
1	West Virginia	78
1	Clemson	73

== Award winners ==
=== Consensus All-American teams ===
Consensus First Team
Player	Position	Class	Team
Kevin Durant	F/G	Freshman	Texas
Alando Tucker	F	Senior	Wisconsin
Acie Law IV	G	Senior	Texas A&M
Arron Afflalo	G	Junior	UCLA
Tyler Hansbrough	F	Sophomore	North Carolina

Consensus Second Team
Player	Position	Class	Team
Nick Fazekas	F	Senior	Nevada
Jared Dudley	F	Senior	Boston College
Chris Lofton	G	Junior	Tennessee
Joakim Noah	F/C	Junior	Florida
Greg Oden	C	Freshman	Ohio State

=== Major player of the year awards ===
- Wooden Award: Kevin Durant, Texas
- Naismith Award: Kevin Durant, Texas
- Associated Press Player of the Year: Kevin Durant, Texas
- NABC Player of the Year: Kevin Durant, Texas
- Oscar Robertson Trophy (USBWA): Kevin Durant, Texas
- Adolph Rupp Trophy: Kevin Durant, Texas
- CBS/Chevrolet Player of the Year: Kevin Durant, Texas
- Sporting News Player of the Year: Kevin Durant, Texas

=== Major freshman of the year awards ===
- USBWA Freshman of the Year: Kevin Durant, Texas
- Sporting News Freshman of the Year: Kevin Durant, Texas

=== Major coach of the year awards ===
- Associated Press Coach of the Year: Tony Bennett, Washington State
- Henry Iba Award (USBWA): Tony Bennett, Washington State
- NABC Coach of the Year: Todd Lickliter, Butler
- Naismith College Coach of the Year: Tony Bennett, Washington State
- CBS/Chevrolet Coach of the Year: Tony Bennett, Washington State
- Adolph Rupp Cup: Bo Ryan, Wisconsin
- Sporting News Coach of the Year: Tony Bennett, Washington State

=== Other major awards ===
- Bob Cousy Award (best point guard): Acie Law IV, Texas A&M
- Pete Newell Big Man Award (best big man): Greg Oden, Ohio State
- NABC Defensive Player of the Year: Greg Oden, Ohio State
- Frances Pomeroy Naismith Award (best player under 6'0"): Tre Kelley, South Carolina
- Lowe's Senior CLASS Award (top senior): Alando Tucker, Wisconsin
- Robert V. Geasey Trophy (top player in Philadelphia Big 5): Ibrahim Jaaber, Penn
- NIT/Haggerty Award (top player in New York City metro area): Jared Jordan, Marist
- Chip Hilton Player of the Year Award (Strong personal character): Acie Law IV, Texas A&M

== Coaching changes ==
A number of teams changed coaches throughout the season and after the season ended.

Team	Former coach	Interim coach	New coach	Reason
Air Force	Jeff Bzdelik		Jeff Reynolds	Air Force turned to assistant Reynolds after Bzdelic left for the Big 12.
Arkansas	Stan Heath		John Pelphrey	Arkansas turned to Pelphrey after Creigton's Dana Altman accepted the job, then changed his mind after the press conference introducing him as the Razorbacks' head coach.
Ball State	Ronny Thompson		Billy Taylor	Thompson resigned after two years of NCAA violations concerning impermissible offseason workouts.
Binghamton	Al Walker		Kevin Broadus	
Bowling Green	Dan Dakich		Louis Orr	Dakich resigned after failing to make the NCAA tournament in ten straight years.
Butler	Todd Lickliter		Brad Stevens	Lickliter capitalized on his NABC Coach of the Year Award by parlaying it into a Big Ten head job at Iowa.
Chicago State	Kevin Jones		Benjy Taylor	
Coastal Carolina	Buzz Peterson		Cliff Ellis	Buzz Peterson left Coastal to work in the Charlotte Bobcats front office for his former UNC roommate Michael Jordan.
Colorado	Ricardo Patton		Jeff Bzdelik	Patton announced in October that it would be his last season at Colorado, and resigned at the end of the year.
Colorado State	Dale Layer		Tim Miles	
Denver	Terry Carroll		Joe Scott	Denver turned to former Air Force and Princeton coach Joe Scott.
Drake	Tom Davis		Keno Davis	Dr. Tom Davis retired after 32 years and 598 wins, turning the Drake program over to his son Keno.
East Carolina	Ricky Stokes		Mack McCarthy	
Eastern Washington	Mike Burns		Kirk Earlywine	
Evansville	Steve Merfeld		Marty Simmons	Evansville hired former Purple Aces star Marty Simmons to take over the struggling program.
Florida A&M	Mike Gillespie		Eugene Harris	Gillespie was fired after being charged with misdemeanor stalking.
Georgia State	Mike Perry		Rod Barnes	Georgia State hired former SEC Coach of the Year Rod Barnes.
Harvard	Frank Sullivan		Tommy Amaker	Former Seton Hall and Michigan head coach Amaker found himself in the Ivy League.
Hawaii	Riley Wallace		Bob Nash	Wallace announced his resignation in December and stepped down at the end of the season.
Illinois State	Porter Moser		Tim Jankovich	
Indiana State	Royce Waltman		Kevin McKenna	
Iona	Jeff Ruland		Kevin Willard	Former Gaels star Ruland was fired after a 2–28 campaign.
Iowa	Steve Alford		Todd Lickliter	New Mexico wooed away the Big Ten's Alford.
Kansas State	Bob Huggins		Frank Martin	Huggins left at the end of the season for his alma mater, turning over the K-State program (and a top-ranked recruiting class) to assistant Martin.
Kentucky	Tubby Smith		Billy Gillispie	Smith shocked the basketball world by leaving Kentucky for Minnesota.
Lehigh	Billy Taylor		Brett Reed	
Liberty	Randy Dunton		Ritchie McKay	
Long Beach State	Larry Reynolds		Dan Monson	Reynolds was fired despite winning the Big West, being named conference Coach of the Year, and getting Long Beach State to their first NCAA Tournament in over 20 years.
Louisiana Tech	Keith Richard		Kerry Rupp	
Marshall	Ron Jirsa		Donnie Jones	
Maryland-Eastern Shore	Larry Leggett	Meredith Smith	Frankie Allen	
Michigan	Tommy Amaker		John Beilein	The Wolverines tabbed West Virginia's Beilein after firing Amaker due to the program's lack of progress.
Minnesota	Dan Monson	Jim Molinari	Tubby Smith	Minnesota made the highest-profile coaching change of the season.
New Mexico	Ritchie McKay		Steve Alford	
New Mexico State	Reggie Theus		Marvin Menzies	Theus left in the offseason to become head coach of the NBA's Sacramento Kings.
New Orleans	Buzz Williams		Joe Pasternack	Williams resigned after only one year at UNO, making the unusual move to an assistant coaching position at Marquette.
Norfolk State	Dwight Freeman	Anthony Evans	Anthony Evans	
North Dakota State	Tim Miles		Saul Phillips	
Northern Illinois	Rob Judson		Ricardo Patton	NIU scored a mid-major coup, hiring former Big 12 coach Patton.
Princeton	Joe Scott		Sydney Johnson	Princeton hired former three-time Tigers captain Johnson after fellow alum Scot left for Denver.
Quinnipiac	Joe DeSantis		Tom Moore	Qunnipiac tapped Moore, an assistant from nearby power UConn.
Radford	Byron Samuels		Brad Greenberg	Samuels announced his intention to resign at the end of the season. at which time Brad Greenberg – brother of Virginia Tech head coach Seth Greenberg – is hired.
Robert Morris	Mark Schmidt		Mike Rice	
Saint Louis	Brad Soderberg		Rick Majerus	Saint Louis lured ESPN announcer Rick Majerus back into the coaching box.
San Diego	Brad Holland		Bill Grier	
Santa Clara	Dick Davey		Kerry Keating	Dick Davey retired after 30 years.
South Alabama	John Pelphrey		Ronnie Arrow	Former Jaguars coach Arrow returned for a second stint at the school.
South Carolina State	Jammal Brown		Tim Carter	
South Florida	Robert McCullum		Stan Heath	Heath landed the Bulls job just a week after being fired by Arkansas.
Southern Utah	Bill Evans		Roger Reid	
St. Bonaventure	Anthony Solomon		Mark Schmidt	
Texas A&M	Billy Gillispie		Mark Turgeon	Texas A&M snagged Mark Turgeon from Wichita State after Gillispie left for Kentucky.
Texas A&M – CC	Ronnie Arrow		Perry Clark	
UC Riverside	David Spencer	Vonn Webb	Jim Wooldridge	
UMKC	Rich Zvosec		Matt Brown	
Utah	Ray Giacoletti		Jim Boylen	
Wake Forest	Skip Prosser		Dino Gaudio	Prosser died of an apparent heart attack after the season. Assistant Gaudio was named permanent head coach.
West Virginia	John Beilein		Bob Huggins	
Wichita State	Mark Turgeon		Gregg Marshall	Marshall, who led Winthrop to seven NCAA tournaments in his nine years there, was tagged by WSU after the departure of Turgeon to Texas A&M.
Winthrop	Gregg Marshall		Randy Peele	
Wyoming	Steve McClain		Heath Schroyer	
