= 2007 Big West Conference men's basketball tournament =

- Classification: Division I
- Season: 2006–07
- Teams: 8
- Site: Honda Center; Anaheim, CA
- Champions: Long Beach State (4th title)
- Winning coach: Larry Reynolds (5th title)
- MVP: Aaron Nixon (Long Beach State)

2006–07 Big West men's basketball standings
	Conf.				Overall
Team	W		L	PCT	W		L	PCT
Long Beach State†	12	–	2	.857	24	–	8	.750
Cal State Fullerton	9	–	5	.643	20	–	10	.667
Cal Poly	9	–	5	.643	19	–	11	.633
UC Santa Barbara	9	–	5	.643	18	–	11	.621
UC Irvine	6	–	8	.429	15	–	18	.455
Cal State Northridge	5	–	9	.357	14	–	17	.452
Pacific	5	–	9	.357	12	–	19	.387
UC Riverside	1	–	13	.071	7	–	24	.226
† 2007 Big West tournament winner As of April 10, 2007; Rankings from AP poll

The 2007 Big West Conference men's basketball tournament was held March 7–10 at Anaheim Convention Center in Anaheim, California.

Long Beach State defeated Cal Poly in the championship game, 94–83, to obtain the fourth Big West Conference men's basketball tournament championship in school history.

The 49ers earned the conference's automatic bid to the 2007 NCAA tournament as the #12 seed in the San Antonio region.

== Format ==
All eight teams in the conference participated. Teams were seeded based on regular season conference records. The top four seeds received byes, with the top two seeds receiving a second bye into the semifinal round.

== Bracket ==
First round Wednesday, March 7
7	Pacific	71
6	Cal State Northridge	54
5	UC Irvine	53
8	UC Riverside	52

Quarterfinals; Thursday, March 8
3	Cal State Fullerton	100
7	Pacific	92
5	UC Irvine	70
4	UC Santa Barbara	52

Semifinals; Friday, March 9
2	Cal Poly	81
3	Cal State Fullerton	56
1	Long Beach State	77
5	UC Irvine	63

Championship; Saturday, March 10
1	Long Beach State	94
2	Cal Poly	83
