= 2006–07 Eastern Kentucky Colonels basketball team =

American college basketball season

2006–07 Eastern Kentucky Colonels men's basketball
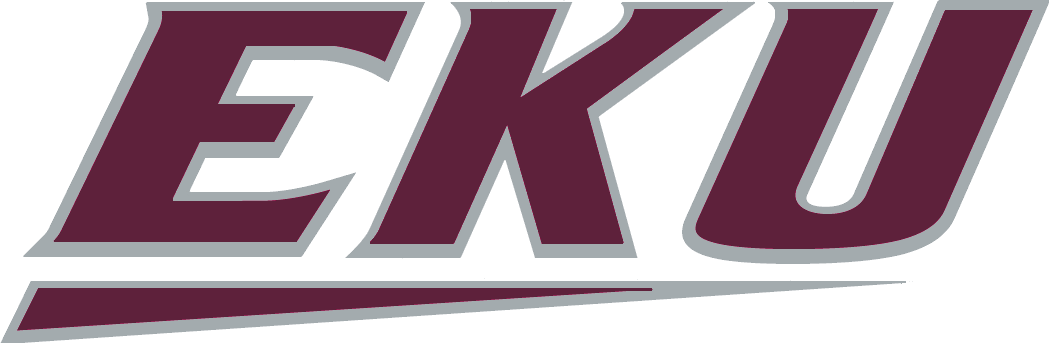

Ohio Valley tournament champions

NCAA tournament, round of 64
- Conference: Ohio Valley Conference
- East Division
- Record: 21–12 (13–7 OVC)
- Head coach: Jeff Neubauer (2nd season)
- Assistant coaches: David Boyden; Ted Hotaling (2nd season); Josh Merkel
- Home arena: McBrayer Arena

2006–07 Ohio Valley Conference men's basketball standings
	Conf.				Overall
Team	W		L	PCT	W		L	PCT
Austin Peay	16	–	4	.800	21	–	12	.636
Eastern Kentucky †	13	–	7	.650	21	–	12	.636
Tennessee Tech	13	–	7	.650	19	–	13	.594
Murray State	13	–	7	.650	16	–	14	.533
Samford	12	–	8	.600	16	–	16	.500
Southeast Missouri State	9	–	11	.450	11	–	20	.355
Morehead State	8	–	12	.400	12	–	18	.400
Tennessee State	8	–	12	.400	12	–	20	.375
Jacksonville State	7	–	13	.350	9	–	22	.290
Eastern Illinois	6	–	14	.300	10	–	20	.333
UT Martin	5	–	15	.250	8	–	23	.258
† 2007 Ohio Valley Conference tournament winner Rankings from AP Poll

The 2006–07 Eastern Kentucky Colonels basketball team represented Eastern Kentucky University during the 2006–07 NCAA Division I men's basketball season. The Colonels, led by second-year head coach Jeff Neubauer, played their home games at McBrayer Arena within Alumni Coliseum and were members of the East Division of the Ohio Valley Conference. They finished the season 21–12, 13–7 in OVC play to finish in second place. They were champions of the OVC tournament to earn an automatic bid to the NCAA tournament where they lost in the opening round to No. 1 seed North Carolina.

== Roster ==
2006–07 Eastern Kentucky Colonels men's basketball team
Players
Coaches

Pos.	#	Name	Height	Weight	Year	Previous school	Hometown
G	3	Robin Mestdagh	6 ft 4 in (1.93 m)	180 lb (82 kg)	Fr	Sint-Vincentius College	Ieper, Belgium
G	10	Adam Leonard	6 ft 0 in (1.83 m)	185 lb (84 kg)	Fr	Lee's Summit North	Kansas City, Missouri
G	11	Ryan Dillman	6 ft 0 in (1.83 m)	170 lb (77 kg)		Evansville Central	Evansville, Indiana
G	13	Harrison Brown	6 ft 4 in (1.93 m)	187 lb (85 kg)		Winton Woods	Cincinnati, Ohio
F	15	Michael Brock	6 ft 7 in (2.01 m)	225 lb (102 kg)		Simon Kenton	Independence, Kentucky
G	20	Mike Rose	6 ft 4 in (1.93 m)	195 lb (88 kg)	So	Neuqua Valley	Naperville, Illinois
F/C	21	Darnell Dialls	6 ft 8 in (2.03 m)	210 lb (95 kg)	Jr	Lafayette	Lexington, Kentucky
F	22	Josh Daniel	6 ft 5 in (1.96 m)	195 lb (88 kg)	Fr	South Charleston	Charleston, West Virginia
G	23	Julian Mascoll	6 ft 4 in (1.93 m)	200 lb (91 kg)		Countryside	Clearwater, Florida
F	24	Josh Taylor	6 ft 7 in (2.01 m)	220 lb (100 kg)	Fr	Brentwood	Pittsburgh, Pennsylvania
F	32	Justin Woods	6 ft 4 in (1.93 m)	220 lb (100 kg)	Jr	Johnson Central	West Van Lear, Kentucky
F	34	Jamaal Douglas	6 ft 7 in (2.01 m)	250 lb (113 kg)	Jr	Palmer Trinity School; Lafayette	Nassau, Bahamas
F	44	Ryan Wiersma	6 ft 6 in (1.98 m)	215 lb (98 kg)	Jr	Newark	Newark, Ohio

Head coach

- Jeff Neubauer

Assistant coach(es)

- David Boyden
- Ted Hotaling (Albany)
- Josh Merkel (Salisbury)

Legend

- (C) Team captain
- (S) Suspended
- (I) Ineligible
- (W) Walk-on
- Injured
- Current redshirt

Roster

== Schedule and results ==
Date time, TV	Rank^{#}	Opponent^{#}	Result	Record	Site (attendance) city, state
Regular season
Nov 10, 2006*; 7:00 p.m.		Asbury	W 63–46	1–0	McBrayer Arena (1,600); Richmond, Kentucky
Nov 13, 2006*; 7:00 p.m.		East Tennessee State	W 70–53	2–0	McBrayer Arena (2,600); Richmond, Kentucky
Nov 17, 2006*; 7:00 p.m., ESPN Plus		at No. 5 Ohio State	L 45–74	2–1	Jerome Schottenstein Center (18,882); Columbus, Ohio
Nov 20, 2006*; 7:00 p.m.		Kenyon	W 63–52	3–1	McBrayer Arena (1,400); Richmond, Kentucky
Nov 25, 2006*; 4:30 p.m.		at UNC Asheville	W 73–54	4–1	Justice Center (778); Asheville, North Carolina
Nov 28, 2006*; 7:00 p.m.		at James Madison	W 70–66	5–1	JMU Convocation Center (3,078); Harrisonburg, Virginia
Dec 2, 2006*; 8:00 p.m.		at Western Kentucky	L 55–78	5–2	E. A. Diddle Arena (6,438); Bowling Green, Kentucky
Dec 7, 2006; 7:30 p.m.		Murray State	W 72–66 ^{OT}	6–2 (1–0)	McBrayer Arena (3,200); Richmond, Kentucky
Dec 9, 2006; 4:00 p.m.		Austin Peay	L 57–59	6–3 (1–1)	McBrayer Arena (2,450); Richmond, Kentucky
Dec 18, 2006; 8:35 p.m.		at Eastern Illinois	W 73–57	7–3 (2–1)	Lantz Arena (793); Charleston, Illinois
Dec 20, 2006; 8:30 p.m.		at UT Martin	W 82–67	8–3 (3–1)	Skyhawk Arena (1,728); Martin, Tennessee
Dec 30, 2006*; 12:00 p.m.		at Kentucky	L 65–78	8–4	Rupp Arena (23,528); Lexington, Kentucky
Jan 2, 2007; 7:30 p.m.		Southeast Missouri State	L 74–88	8–5 (3–2)	McBrayer Arena (1,600); Richmond, Kentucky
Jan 4, 2007; 8:30 p.m.		at Tennessee Tech	L 53–75	8–6 (3–3)	Hooper Eblen Center (2,249); Cookeville, Tennessee
Jan 9, 2007; 7:00 p.m., ESPNU		Morehead State	W 73–65	9–6 (4–3)	McBrayer Arena (3,100); Richmond, Kentucky
Jan 13, 2007; 4:00 p.m.		Eastern Illinois	W 63–62	10–6 (5–3)	McBrayer Arena (3,050); Richmond, Kentucky
Jan 18, 2007; 8:30 p.m.		at Jacksonville State	L 56–66	10–7 (5–4)	Pete Mathews Coliseum (2,208); Jacksonville, Alabama
Jan 20, 2007; 3:00 p.m.		at Samford	L 46–55	10–8 (5–5)	Seibert Hall (1,129); Homewood, Alabama
Jan 25, 2007; 7:30 p.m.		Tennessee State	L 62–63	10–9 (5–6)	McBrayer Arena (2,725); Richmond, Kentucky
Jan 29, 2007; 7:30 p.m.		UT Martin	W 94–57	11–9 (6–6)	McBrayer Arena (2,800); Richmond, Kentucky
Feb 1, 2007; 8:00 p.m., CWKYT-14		at Morehead State	W 69–61	12–9 (7–6)	Ellis Johnson Arena (4,830); Morehead, Kentucky
Feb 3, 2007; 8:00 p.m.		Tennessee Tech	W 92–90 ^{2OT}	13–9 (8–6)	McBrayer Arena (3,400); Richmond, Kentucky
Feb 8, 2007; 8:30 p.m.		at Murray State	W 64–62	14–9 (9–6)	Regional Special Events Center (3,395); Murray, Kentucky
Feb 10, 2007; 7:00 p.m., ESPNU		at Southeast Missouri State	W 66–61	15–9 (10–6)	Show Me Center (4,325); Cape Girardeau, Missouri
Feb 13, 2007; 3:00 p.m.		Samford	W 46–38	16–9 (11–6)	McBrayer Arena (2,300); Richmond, Kentucky
Feb 15, 2007; 7:30 p.m.		Jacksonville State	W 63–51	17–9 (12–6)	McBrayer Arena (3,050); Richmond, Kentucky
Feb 17, 2007*; 4:25 p.m.		at Youngstown State	L 61–66	17–10	Beeghly Center (2,970); Youngstown, Ohio
Feb 22, 2007; 8:30 p.m.		at Austin Peay	L 68–77	17–11 (12–7)	Dunn Center (2,569); Clarksville, Tennessee
Feb 24, 2007; 7:30 p.m.		at Tennessee State	W 65–53	18–11 (13–7)	Gentry Complex (1,422); Nashville, Tennessee
Ohio Valley Conference tournament
Feb 27, 2007*; 7:00 p.m.	(2)	(7) Morehead State; Quarterfinals	W 63–45	19–11	McBrayer Arena (2,100); Richmond, Kentucky
Mar 2, 2007*; 9:00 p.m.	(2)	vs. (3) Tennessee Tech; Semifinals	W 57–54	20–11	Gaylord Entertainment Center (3,067); Nashville, Tennessee
Mar 3, 2007*; 8:05 p.m.	(2)	vs. (1) Austin Peay; Championship game	W 63–62	21–11	Gaylord Entertainment Center (3,652); Nashville, Tennessee
NCAA tournament
Mar 15, 2007*; 9:50 p.m., CBS	(16 E)	vs. (1 E) No. 4 North Carolina; First Round	L 65–86	21–12	Lawrence Joel Veterans Memorial Coliseum (14,148); Winston-Salem, North Carolina
*Non-conference game. ^{#}Rankings from AP Poll, (#) during NCAA Tournament is seed within region E=East. (#) Tournament seedings in parentheses. All times are in Eastern Time.
