= New Haven Chargers =

Intercollegiate sports teams of the University of New Haven

- University: University of New Haven
- Nickname: Chargers
- NCAA: Division I
- Conference: Northeast Conference
- Athletic director: Devin Crosby
- Location: West Haven, Connecticut
- Varsity teams: 20
- Football stadium: Ralph F. DellaCamera Stadium
- Basketball arena: The Jeffrey P. Hazell Center
- Baseball stadium: Frank Vieira Field
- Softball stadium: UNH Softball Field
- Soccer stadium: Kathy Zolad Stadium
- Lacrosse stadium: Kathy Zolad Stadium
- Volleyball arena: The Jeffery P. Hazel Center
- Colours: Navy and Gold
- Mascot: Charlie the Charger
- Website: newhavenchargers.com

Team NCAA championships
- 1

The New Haven Chargers are the athletic teams that represent the University of New Haven, located in West Haven, Connecticut, in NCAA Division I intercollegiate sports. The Chargers' 20 varsity athletics teams, eight men's and 12 women's, compete as members of the Northeast Conference, with the exception of women's rugby which competes under USA Rugby. New Haven was previously a member of the Northeast-10 Conference from 2008 until their reclassification from NCAA Division II to I on July 1, 2025.

In 2016–17, the women's volleyball and baseball team won Northeast-10 Conference championships. Overall twelve of sixteen teams qualified for postseason play, while six teams (men's & women's cross country, volleyball, baseball, women's lacrosse and softball) advanced to the NCAA Championships. Six Chargers were named All-Americans following their respective seasons; Zach Voytek (football), Tyler Condit (football), Kendall Cietek (women's lacrosse), Nicole Belanger (women's lacrosse), Hannah Johnson (women's lacrosse) and Robert Petrillo (baseball). Off the fields, courts and tracks, the Chargers 300-plus student-athletes combined for a 3.01 grade point average in the Spring of 2017, the 18th straight season with a cumulative GPA of 3.0 or higher. Additionally, 343 Chargers received NE10 Commissioner's Honor Roll accolades, while 163 were named to the New Haven Dean's List.

== Teams ==
Men's sports	Women's sports
Baseball	Softball
Basketball	Basketball
Cross Country	Cross Country
Football	Field Hockey
Golf	Golf
Soccer	Soccer
Track & Field	Track & Field
	Lacrosse
	Rugby
	Tennis
	Volleyball

== Varsity teams ==
=== Men's basketball ===
Men's basketball was the first intercollegiate athletic program at the University of New Haven. They began play in the 1960–61 season, under director of athletics and head basketball coach Don Ormrod.

Ted Hotaling has been the head men's basketball coach at the University of New Haven since 2010. Under his guidance, the team has made three NCAA II tournament appearances with an overall record of 155-128. Hotaling is the second winningest coach in University of New Haven men's basketball history.

In 2014–15, New Haven Charger, Eric Anderson became the first Northeast-10 player to be named Defensive Player of the Year for three seasons in a row with 13.1 rebounds per game and 9.85 defensive rebounds per game. He was also 8th in the nation in double doubles and 5th in total rebounds. Anderson went on to play professionally in Germany, Luxembourg, Japan, Argentina, Israel, and Portugal.

== 2016–17 Northeast-10 Conference champions ==
=== Volleyball ===
The Chargers secured their fifth NE10 Conference Championship with a four-set win over Adelphi on November 19. 2016. With the victory, New Haven secured its 31st berth in the NCAA Division II Championship tournament.

In the NE10 final, New Haven was led by NE10 Championship Most Outstanding Player who finished with a triple double, her third in as many games in the NE10 Championship. Overall, she finished with 10 kills, 20 assists and 15 digs in the title match. Joining her on the All-Tournament team was senior outside hitter Meghan Kennelly who finished the title match with a team-high 15 kills. Junior Caroline Martins and freshman Mallory Nowicki rounded out the leading hitters for New Haven, finishing with 14 and 11 kills, respectively.

=== Baseball ===
The New Haven baseball team swept a doubleheader from Franklin Pierce to secure its second Northeast-10 Conference Championship. Junior pitcher David Palmer was named the NE10 Championship Most Outstanding Player. In addition to Palmer, senior Nick Perelli and freshman Devon DiMascio were each named to the All-Championship Team. With the victories, New Haven earned its 29th berth to the NCAA Division II East Regional, hosted by Southern New Hampshire.

== National championships ==
=== Team ===
Association	Division	Sport	Year	Opponent/Runner-up	Score
NCAA (1)	Division II (1)	Women's Basketball (1)	1987	Cal Poly Pomona	77–75

== Campus Recreation ==
Campus Recreation at the University of New Haven offers various programs including; group exercise classes, personal training, massage therapy, intramural sports, club sports, hiking trips, CPR/AED/FA classes, special events, and a comprehensive student employment program.

On campus, Campus Recreation is commonly referred to as ChargerREC.

== Beckerman Recreation Center ==
The home of most campus recreation programs is the Beckerman Recreation Center, named after David A. Beckerman, founder of Starter Clothing Line.

The $15.5 million Beckerman Center at the University of New Haven is a comprehensive 56,500 square-foot Student Recreation Center consisting of:

- Two Multi-Purpose Group Fitness Studios
- Weight Room and Fitness Center (6,000 square-feet)
- Two Racquetball Courts
- Two Hardwood Activity Courts (with capabilities for basketball, volleyball & badminton)
- Multi-Activity Court (with capabilities for basketball, volleyball indoor soccer, floor/roller hockey and other various activities)
- Jogging Track (1/10 of a mile)
- NRgize Juice Bar
- Men's, Women's and Individual Use Locker Rooms
- Lounge Area
- Lobby Area
- Office Suite

== Club sports ==
There are 11 recognized Club Sports at the University of New Haven. Club Sports are recreation or athletics student-led organizations who compete with other universities and colleges. Each club is a University of New Haven recognized student organization and member of a regional or national governing association. Participation and individual dues vary by club.

- Ice Hockey (Men's)
- Lacrosse (Men's)
- Baseball
- Rugby (Women's and Men's)
- Ultimate Frisbee (CoRec)
- Field hockey (CoRec)
- Tennis (CoRec)
- Soccer (Men's)
- Wrestling (CoRec)
- Volleyball (Women's and Men's)

== RECSports (Intramural Sports) ==
RECSports is an extensive intramural sport program, which provides participants the opportunity to compete and socialize through organized sports leagues, one-day tournament, special events and online programs. Over 50 team and individual sport programs are offered throughout the academic year. Access to all RECSports programs is free and open to all University of New Haven students.

== Fitness and wellness ==
- GroupX classes are drop-in fitness classes designed for participants of all levels. A diverse range of classes is highlighted by Spinning, Meditation, Yoga, Cardio/Strength, Core, Zumba, and High Intensity based formats. Over 25 classes are offered each week during the academic year. Access to all GroupX classes is free and open to all University of New Haven students.
- Massage Therapy offers participants an opportunity for relaxation and stress relief. Massage therapists will work with participants to develop and individualized session focusing in their stress reduction needs.
- Personal Training offers participants and opportunity for 1-on-1 or small group fitness training. Personal trainers will work with participants to develop an individualized program to meet their personal fitness goals.

== Other programs ==
- TeamREC is an experiential based employment program, where student employees are challenged to manage the programs of ChargerREC and the operations of the Beckerman Recreation Center. ChargerREC is the largest employer on campus, employing over 100 students each year.
- OutdoorREC are hiking trips which offer participants the opportunity to explore scenic trails throughout the state of Connecticut and surrounding area.
