= 2007 Atlantic Sun men's basketball tournament =

- Classification: Division I
- Season: 2006–07
- Teams: 8
- Site: Memorial Center; Johnson City, Tennessee
- Champions: Belmont Bruins (2nd title)
- Winning coach: Rick Byrd (2nd title)
- MVP: Justin Hare (Belmont)

2006–07 Atlantic Sun men's basketball standings
	Conf.				Overall
Team	W		L	PCT	W		L	PCT
East Tennessee State	16	–	2	.889	24	–	10	.706
Belmont †	14	–	4	.778	23	–	10	.697
Lipscomb	11	–	7	.611	18	–	13	.581
Jacksonville	11	–	7	.611	15	–	14	.517
Kennesaw State	9	–	9	.500	13	–	18	.419
Mercer	8	–	10	.444	13	–	17	.433
Campbell	7	–	11	.389	14	–	17	.452
Gardner–Webb	7	–	11	.389	9	–	21	.300
Stetson	6	–	12	.333	11	–	20	.355
North Florida	1	–	17	.056	3	–	26	.103
† 2007 Atlantic Sun Tournament winner As of March 6, 2007; Rankings from AP Poll

The 2007 Atlantic Sun men's basketball tournament was the 29th edition of the Atlantic Sun Conference (A-Sun)'s Men's Basketball Tournament. It took place from March 1–3, 2007 at the Memorial Center on the campus of East Tennessee State University in Johnson City, Tennessee. The Belmont University Bruins won the tournament, defeating the East Tennessee State University Buccaneers 94–67 in the final.

== Format ==
The top eight eligible men's basketball teams in the Atlantic Sun Conference received a berth in the conference tournament. After the 20-game conference season, teams are seeded by conference record.

== Bracket ==
Quarterfinals; March 6, 7
1	ETSU	77
8	Stetson	61
4	Lipscomb	85
5	Mercer	49
3	Jacksonville	85
6	Campbell	90*
2	Belmont	79
7	Gardner-Webb	61

Semifinals; March 8
1	ETSU	77
4	Lipscomb	72
6	Campbell	63
2	Belmont	79

Championship Game; March 9
1	ETSU	67
2	Belmont	94

Asterisk denotes overtime game

== Awards and honors ==
=== Tournament MVP ===
Justin Hare of Belmont was awarded MVP honors in the 2007 Atlantic Sun Conference tournament.

=== All-Tournament Team ===
All-Tournament Team
Brian Fisk (Lipscomb)
Courtney Pigram (ETSU)
Andrew Preston (Belmont)
Mike Smith (ETSU)
Andy Wicke (Belmont)
