= Ronnie Arrow =

American former basketball coach (born 1947)

Biographical details
- Born: August 28, 1947 (age 79); Houston, Texas, U.S.

Playing career
- 1966–1969: Southwest Texas State

Coaching career (HC unless noted)
- 1969–1972: Sam Houston State (asst.)
- 1972–1976: Pasadena HS (TX)
- 1977–1987: San Jacinto College
- 1987–1994: South Alabama
- 1999–2007: Texas A&M–Corpus Christi
- 2007–2012: South Alabama

Head coaching record
- Overall: 345–252 (.578) (college); 301–43 (.875) (junior college)
- Tournaments: 1–4 (NCAA Division I)

Accomplishments and honors

Championships
- 3 NJCAA tournament (1983, 1984, 1986); 10 TJCAC regular season (1978–1987); 3 Sun Belt regular season (1989, 1991, 2008); 2 Sun Belt tournament (1989, 1991); Southland regular season (2007); Southland tournament (2007)

Awards
- 2x NJCAA Coach of the Year (1983, 1986); 3× Sun Belt Coach of the Year (1989, 1991, 2008); Southland Coach of the Year (2007); NJCAA Hall of Fame (1990)

Ronnie Lee Arrow (born August 28, 1947) is an American former college basketball coach who was most recently the head coach at the University of South Alabama.

== Playing career ==
Arrow was a two-year All-Lone Star Conference honoree and a three-year letterman at Southwest Texas State (presently named Texas State). He graduated with a bachelor's degree in health and physical education in 1969.

== Coaching career ==
=== San Jacinto ===
Arrow served as head coach at San Jacinto College in Pasadena, Texas from 1977 to 1987 where he tallied a record of 302–43 and guided the Ravens to 10 Texas Junior College Athletic Conference titles as well as NJCAA championships in 1983, 1984 and 1986. He was named the NJCAA Region XIV Coach-of-the-Year in 1983, 1984, 1986, 1987 and the national Coach-of-the-Year in 1983 and 1986. His 1985–86 squad led the nation in scoring, averaging 101 points per game.

=== South Alabama ===
Arrow was named head coach of the Jaguars on July 1, 1987 and in his seven seasons as the Jaguars coach, Arrow compiled a record of 114–93.

Arrow was named Sun Belt Coach of the Year in 1989 after guiding the Jaguars to both the regular and post-season tournament SunBelt titles.

South Alabama finished with a 23–9 mark, a first round NCAA Tournament victory over cross-state rival Alabama before falling 91–82 to the eventual national champion Michigan in the second round. The Jags finished the season ranked 24th in the country.

Following the 1990–1991 season, Arrow was named the Sun Belt Conference Coach-of-the-Year for the second time after engineering the most dramatic turnaround in league history. That year, his Jaguars became the first SunBelt squad ever to leap from last to first place in a single season. Projected to finish fifth in the conference, South Alabama went on to capture the league crown with an 11–3 mark.

The Jags finished the season with a 22–9 record, swept through the Sun Belt Tournament and advanced to the NCAA Tournament before falling to Utah in the first-round.

Over the years, Arrow developed a reputation in the collegiate basketball circles for up-tempo, high-scoring teams. His squads led the Sun Belt Conference in scoring four of his seven seasons at South Alabama. His 1988–89 squad set a school and league record 91 points per game average and five of his seven teams tallied at least 80 points per game.

Arrow was dismissed by then university president Frederick Whiddon in the fall of 1994 after beginning that season 1–3 and suffering losses in his final two games by 68 and 46 points.

=== Junior World Cup Team ===
In the summer of 1989, Arrow coached the United States Junior World Cup Team to a perfect 7–0 record and the gold medal at the Pan-American Basketball Confederation (COPABA) Junior World Championship in Uruguay.

Among his players were future NBA stars Grant Hill, Calbert Cheaney and Allan Houston.

=== Texas A&M–Corpus Christi ===
Arrow is the first basketball coach at TAMCC and started the program as a Division I school after it had gone 25 years without a basketball program. He got the job thanks to a recommendation from Tim Floyd.

Arrow began the Islanders program in July 1998. Arrow guided A&M–Corpus Christi to an impressive 13–13 mark in year one of the project. The Islanders, winners of five-consecutive games to close the season, turned some heads early with their 76–74 upset of 2000 NCAA-Tournament qualifier, Samford in the first round of the Holiday Tribune Classic. A&M-Corpus Christi even took its cracks at "Goliath" as well. In the finals of the Holiday Tribune Classic, the Islanders were tied 34–34 with Iowa State, the eventual champion of the Big 12 Conference and a team that advanced to the Elite Eight.

Arrow put Texas A&M–Corpus Christi on the national map in 2003 when they were ranked in the top-25 Mid-Major Poll nearly the entire season last year and even received votes in the ESPN/USA Today Top-25 Coaches Poll during the 2004–2005 season.

His Islanders got immediate attention when they took down Florida State, 70–67 on the Seminoles home court on Nov 22, 2004, then followed that up with an upset win over Old Dominion, handing the Monarchs one of their five losses in the regular season.

During his tenure, Arrow led the Islanders to wins over such programs as Texas Tech and Texas A&M, as well as 2004 NCAA Tournament-qualifier Murray State.

During the 2000–01 campaign, Arrow's Islanders notched a 14–14 record, which included an 86–80 victory over Texas Tech in Lubbock. Under his direction, the Islanders eclipsed the 100-point barrier six times en route to an 85.5-point per game average, which would have ranked third in the country if not for TAMUCC's "provisional" status. Michael Hicks finished off his brilliant two-year career by posting 26.7 points per contest, which would have ranked second among all NCAA Division I scorers. He gained all-region honors following the season.

In 2007 Arrow and the Islanders earned their first berth in the NCAA Tournament at Midwest Regional as the #15 seed. They lost 76–63 to #2 seed Wisconsin in the first round.

Arrow was 134–91 in eight years at A&M-Corpus Christi. His last three years, the Islanders were 66–23. They won the Southland Conference regular-season and tournament titles and made the school's first NCAA appearance in 2007, losing to number 2 seed, Wisconsin in the first round after leading by 18 pts. He was named the 2007 Southland Conference Coach of the Year.

=== South Alabama (second stint) ===
On April 17, 2007 Arrow returned for a second tenure at South Alabama. He inherited a veteran team left by John Pelphrey, who left for the University of Arkansas. Arrow intended to employ an up-tempo style and build on the success of a South Alabama club that went 44–19 the last two years under Pelphrey.

On January 24, 2009, in a game against the University of Louisiana at Lafayette's Ragin' Cajuns, Arrow contested the winning shot, claiming that the buzzer sounded before the Cajuns' Randell Daigle made the 3-point shot to win the game. After reviewing the video, Arrow argued with officials while a sports intern from KLFY-TV filmed the incident. There has been no official complaint filed with the Sun Belt Conference or with South Alabama over the ordeal.

Arrow abruptly announced his retirement from the University of South Alabama on December 19, 2012. The Jaguars had a 5–5 record at the time. He was succeeded on an interim basis by associate head coach Jeff Price.

== Head coaching record ==
=== College ===
Record table
Season	Team	Overall	Conference	Standing	Postseason
South Alabama Jaguars (Sun Belt Conference) (1987–1994)
1987–88	South Alabama	15–14	8–6	4th	
1988–89	South Alabama	23–9	11–3	1st	NCAA Division I Second Round
1989–90	South Alabama	11–17	5–9	T–6th	
1990–91	South Alabama	22–9	11–3	1st	NCAA Division I First Round
1991–92	South Alabama	14–14	9–7	5th	
1992–93	South Alabama	15–13	9–9	6th	
1993–94	South Alabama	13–14	9–9	T–6th	
1994–95	South Alabama	1–3	–	–	
Texas A&M–Corpus Christi Islanders (NCAA Division III Independent) (1999–2002)
1999–00	Texas A&M–Corpus Christi	13–13			
2000–01	Texas A&M–Corpus Christi	14–14			
2001–02	Texas A&M–Corpus Christi	12–15			
Texas A&M–Corpus Christi Islanders (NCAA Division I Independent) (2002–2006)
2002–03	Texas A&M–Corpus Christi	14–15			
2003–04	Texas A&M–Corpus Christi	15–11			
2004–05	Texas A&M–Corpus Christi	20–8			
2005–06	Texas A&M–Corpus Christi	20–8			
Texas A&M–Corpus Christi Islanders (Southland Conference) (2006–2007)
2006–07	Texas A&M–Corpus Christi	26–7	14–2	1st (West)	NCAA Division I First Round
Texas A&M–Corpus Christi:		134–91 (.596)	14–2 (.875)		
South Alabama Jaguars (Sun Belt Conference) (2007–2012)
2007–08	South Alabama	26–7	16–2	T–1st (East)	NCAA Division I First Round
2008–09	South Alabama	20–13	10–8	T–3rd (East)	
2009–10	South Alabama	17–15	8–10	5th (East)	
2010–11	South Alabama	12–16	6–10	T–4th (East)	
2011–12	South Alabama	17–12	8–8	2nd (East)	
2012–13	South Alabama	5–5	–	–	
South Alabama:		211–161 (.567)	110–84 (.567)		
Total:		345–252 (.578)			
National champion Postseason invitational champion Conference regular season champion Conference regular season and conference tournament champion Division regular season champion Division regular season and conference tournament champion Conference tournament champion

=== Junior College ===
Record table
Season	Team	Overall	Conference	Standing	Postseason
San Jacinto College Gators (Texas Junior College Athletic Conference) (1977–1987)
1977–78	San Jacinto College	27–9		1st	
1978–79	San Jacinto College	26–7		1st	
1979–80	San Jacinto College	25–7		1st	
1980–81	San Jacinto College	25–7		1st	
1981–82	San Jacinto College	30–4		1st	
1982–83	San Jacinto College	35–2		1st	NJCAA Tournament Champion
1983–84	San Jacinto College	35–2		1st	NJCAA Tournament Champion
1984–85	San Jacinto College	25–4		1st	
1985–86	San Jacinto College	37–0		1st	NJCAA Tournament Champion
1986–87	San Jacinto College	36–1		1st	NJCAA Division I Fifth Place
San Jacinto College:		301–43 (.875)			
Total:		301–43 (.875)			
National champion Postseason invitational champion Conference regular season champion Conference regular season and conference tournament champion Division regular season champion Division regular season and conference tournament champion Conference tournament champion

== Awards ==
- 1983 NJCAA National Coach of the Year
- 1983 NJCAA Region XIV Coach of the Year
- 1984 NJCAA Region XIV Coach of the Year
- 1986 NJCAA National Coach of the Year
- 1986 NJCAA Region XIV Coach of the Year
- 1987 NJCAA Region XIV Coach of the Year
- 1989 Sunbelt Conference Coach of the Year
- 1991 Sunbelt Conference Coach of the Year
- 2007 Southland Conference Coach of the Year
- 2008 Sunbelt Conference Coach of the Year

== Personal ==
- Arrow and his wife, Nelda, have one daughter, Ailey.
- In junior college, Arrow coached several players who went onto enjoy careers in the NBA: Walter Berry, Alton Lister, Ladell Eackles and Larry Spriggs.
- Bachelor of Science, Southwest Texas State, 1969
- Master of Education, Sam Houston State, 1972
- Before becoming a college coach, Arrow served as head coach at Pasadena (Texas) High School.
