= 2007 Ohio Valley Conference men's basketball tournament =

- Classification: Division I
- Season: 2006–07
- Teams: 8
- First round site: Campus Sites
- Semifinals site: Gaylord Entertainment Center; Nashville, Tennessee
- Finals site: Gaylord Entertainment Center; Nashville, Tennessee
- Champions: Eastern Kentucky (5th title)
- Winning coach: Jeff Neubauer (1st title)
- MVP: Mike Rose (Eastern Kentucky)

2006–07 Ohio Valley Conference men's basketball standings
	Conf.				Overall
Team	W		L	PCT	W		L	PCT
Austin Peay	16	–	4	.800	21	–	12	.636
Eastern Kentucky †	13	–	7	.650	21	–	12	.636
Tennessee Tech	13	–	7	.650	19	–	13	.594
Murray State	13	–	7	.650	16	–	14	.533
Samford	12	–	8	.600	16	–	16	.500
Southeast Missouri State	9	–	11	.450	11	–	20	.355
Morehead State	8	–	12	.400	12	–	18	.400
Tennessee State	8	–	12	.400	12	–	20	.375
Jacksonville State	7	–	13	.350	9	–	22	.290
Eastern Illinois	6	–	14	.300	10	–	20	.333
UT Martin	5	–	15	.250	8	–	23	.258
† 2007 Ohio Valley Conference tournament winner Rankings from AP Poll

The 2007 Ohio Valley Conference men's basketball tournament took place February 27 – March 3, 2007. The first round was hosted by the higher seeded team in each game. The semifinals and finals took place at Gaylord Entertainment Center in Nashville, Tennessee. Eastern Kentucky won the tournament and advanced to the NCAA tournament. Eastern Kentucky drew a 16 seed, facing the number one seeded University of North Carolina.

== Format ==
The top eight eligible men's basketball teams in the Ohio Valley Conference receive a berth in the conference tournament. After the 20 game conference season, teams are seeded by conference record.

== Bracket ==
Quarterfinals; February 27
1	Austin Peay	89
8	Tennessee State	84
4	Murray State	60
5	Samford	70
3	Tennessee Tech	88
6	Southeast Missouri State	60
2	Eastern Kentucky	63
7	Morehead State	45

Semifinals; March 2
1	Austin Peay	65
5	Samford	55
3	Tennessee Tech	54
2	Eastern Kentucky	57

Finals; March 3
1	Austin Peay	62
2	Eastern Kentucky	63

== Sources ==
- First round scores and recap.
- Second round scores and recap.
- Eastern Kentucky advances to NCAA Tournament.
