= New Haven Chargers men's basketball =

College men's basketball team at the University of New Haven

2025–26 New Haven Chargers men's basketball team
- University: University of New Haven
- First season: 1961–62
- All-time record: 902–787 (.534)
- Head coach: Ted Hotaling (15th season)
- Conference: Northeast Conference
- Location: West Haven, Connecticut
- Arena: Jeffrey P. Hazell Athletics Center
- Nickname: Chargers
- Colors: Blue and gold

NCAA tournament appearances
- Division II: 1987, 1988, 1990, 2003, 2004, 2013, 2014, 2019, 2022, 2023

The New Haven Chargers men's basketball team represents the University of New Haven, located in West Haven, Connecticut, in NCAA Division I men's collegiate basketball competition. The Chargers play their home games at the Jeffrey P. Hazell Athletics Center.

While the Chargers were members of the Division II Northeast-10 Conference until June 30, 2025, they transitioned to Division I and joined the Northeast Conference on July 1. Due to the NCAA's policy on reclassifying programs, however, New Haven will not be eligible to compete in the NCAA tournament or the NIT until the 2028–29 season.

== Postseason results ==
=== NCAA Division II ===
The Chargers appeared in ten NCAA tournaments. Their combined record is 8–12.

Year	Round	Opponent	Result
1987	Regional First Round; Regional Third Place	N.H. College; Saint Anselm	L 70–71; L 88–94
1988	Regional First Round; Regional Final	Quinnipiac; Lowell	W 96–62; L 72–84
1990	Regional First Round; Regional Third Place	Bridgeport; N.H. College	L 78–83; L 88–91
2003	Regional First Round; Regional Semifinals	SNHU; C.W. Post	W 76–61; L 61–78
2004	Regional First Round	SNHU	L 67–74
2013	Regional First Round; Regional Semifinals	Dominican (NY); Franklin Pierce	W 73–66; L 63–80
2014	Regional First Round	Bloomfield	L 57–59
2019	Regional First Round; Regional Semifinals	Daemen; Saint Anselm	W 72–67; L 69–70
2022	Regional First Round; Regional Semifinals	Saint Anselm; St. Thomas Aquinas	W 78–70; L 61–71
2023	Regional First Round; Regional Semifinals; Regional Final; Elite Eight	Pace; Caldwell; Bentley; West Liberty	W 83–57; W 77–56; W 69–60; L 58–95

== See also ==
- New Haven Chargers
