= 2006–07 UC Irvine Anteaters men's basketball team =

American college basketball season

2006–07 UC Irvine Anteaters men's basketball
- Conference: Big West Conference
- Record: 15–18 (6–8 Big West)
- Head coach: Pat Douglass (10th season)
- Home arena: Bren Events Center

2006–07 Big West men's basketball standings
	Conf.				Overall
Team	W		L	PCT	W		L	PCT
Long Beach State†	12	–	2	.857	24	–	8	.750
Cal State Fullerton	9	–	5	.643	20	–	10	.667
Cal Poly	9	–	5	.643	19	–	11	.633
UC Santa Barbara	9	–	5	.643	18	–	11	.621
UC Irvine	6	–	8	.429	15	–	18	.455
Cal State Northridge	5	–	9	.357	14	–	17	.452
Pacific	5	–	9	.357	12	–	19	.387
UC Riverside	1	–	13	.071	7	–	24	.226
† 2007 Big West tournament winner As of April 10, 2007; Rankings from AP poll

The 2006–07 UC Irvine Anteaters men's basketball team represented the University of California, Irvine during the 2006–07 NCAA Division I men's basketball season. The Anteaters were led by 10th year head coach Pat Douglass and played at the Bren Events Center. They were members of the Big West Conference.

== Previous season ==
The 2005–06 UC Irvine Anteaters men's basketball team finished the season with a record of 16–13 and 10–4 in Big West play.

== Roster ==
2006–07 UC Irvine Anteaters men's basketball team
Players
Coaches

Pos.	#	Name	Height	Weight	Year	Hometown
G	3	Chuma Awaji	6 ft 3 in (1.91 m)	200 lb (91 kg)	Jr	Los Angeles, CA
G	11	Nic Campbell	6 ft 6 in (1.98 m)	—	Sr
G	40	J.J Cannizzaro	6 ft 3 in (1.91 m)	—	Jr
G	22	Chad DeCasas	6 ft 5 in (1.96 m)	215 lb (98 kg)	Fr	Mission Viejo, CA
C	33	Darren Fells	6 ft 7 in (2.01 m)	255 lb (116 kg)	Jr	Fullerton, CA
C	45	Wolfgang Gieler	6 ft 9 in (2.06 m)	—	Fr
G	1	Michael Hunter	5 ft 10 in (1.78 m)	160 lb (73 kg)	Fr	Aurora, CO
G	20	Justin Johnson	6 ft 2 in (1.88 m)	165 lb (75 kg)	Fr	El Segundo, CA
F	15	Mark Kelley	6 ft 8 in (2.03 m)	—	Sr
G	12	Chad McDaniel	6 ft 0 in (1.83 m)	175 lb (79 kg)	So	Rosamond, CA
G	2	Marcus McIntosh	6 ft 1 in (1.85 m)	186 lb (84 kg)	Jr	Aurora, CO
F	21	Patrick Sanders	6 ft 6 in (1.98 m)	205 lb (93 kg)	Jr	Corona, CA
F	32	Adam Templeton	6 ft 5 in (1.96 m)	—	So

Head coach

Pat Douglass (Pacific)

Assistant coach(es)

Legend

- (C) Team captain
- (S) Suspended
- (I) Ineligible
- (W) Walk-on
- Injured
- Current redshirt

Roster

== Schedule ==
Date time, TV	Rank^{#}	Opponent^{#}	Result	Record	Site (attendance) city, state
Regular Season
November 10, 2006*		vs. South Alabama; Basketball Travelers Classic	L 63–67	0–1	Save Mart Center (10,422); Fresno, CA
November 11, 2006*		vs. Winston-Salem State; Basketball Travelers Classic	W 53–41	1–1	Save Mart Center (10,667); Fresno, CA
November 12, 2006*		at Fresno State; Basketball Travelers Classic	L 51–82	1–2	Save Mart Center (10,163); Fresno, CA
November 14, 2006*		South Carolina	W 67–52	2–2	Bren Events Center (2,328); Irvine, CA
November 17, 2006*		at Oregon	L 42–85	2–3	McArthur Court (8,484); Eugene, OR
November 21, 2006*		at No. 21 Nevada	L 64–83	2–4	Lawlor Events Center (7,160); Reno, NV
November 25, 2006*		Pepperdine	W 68–66	3–4	Bren Events Center (1,067); Irvine, CA
December 9, 2006*		at Loyola Marymount	L 65–73	3–5	Gersten Pavilion (2,158); Los Angeles, CA
December 12, 2006*		at Drake	L 73–76	3–6	Knapp Center (4,855); Des Moines, IA
December 16, 2006*		Sam Houston State	W 70–62 ^{OT}	4–6	Bren Events Center (2,657); Irvine, CA
December 20, 2006*		at DePaul	L 53–65	4–7	Allstate Arena (7,752); Rosemont, IL
December 22, 2006*		at Loyola	L 69–72	4–8	Joseph J. Gentile Center (1,849); Chicago, IL
December 28, 2006*		Harvard	W 81–48	5–8	Bren Events Center (1,946); Irvine, CA
December 30, 2006*		at UC Davis	W 68–48	6–8	The Pavilion (916); Davis, CA
January 4, 2007		Cal Poly	W 66–62	7–8 (1–0)	Bren Events Center (1,720); Irvine, CA
January 6, 2007		UC Santa Barbara	L 59–64	7–9 (1–1)	Bren Events Center (2,128); Irvine, CA
January 11, 2007		at Cal State Northridge	L 61–67	7–10 (1–2)	Matadome (889); Northridge, CA
January 13, 2007		at Pacific	W 67–42	8–10 (2–2)	Alex G. Spanos Center (3,638); Stockton, CA
January 18, 2007		UC Riverside	W 64–48	9–10 (3–2)	Bren Events Center (1,398); Irvine, CA
January 20, 2007		Cal State Fullerton	L 68–71	10–10 (3–3)	Bren Events Center (2,886); Irvine, CA
January 25, 2007		Long Beach State	W 88–84	11–10 (4–3)	Bren Events Center (3,182); Irvine, CA
January 27, 2007		at Cal State Fullerton	L 68–71	11–11 (4–4)	Titan Gym (1,869); Fullerton, CA
February 1, 2007		Pacific	L 82–89	10–13 (4–5)	Bren Events Center (2,538); Irvine, CA
February 3, 2007		Cal State Northridge	W 75–66	11–13 (5–5)	Bren Events Center (4,374); Irvine, CA
February 8, 2007		at UC Santa Barbara	L 62–71	11–14 (5–6)	UC Santa Barbara Events Center (1,919); Santa Barbara, CA
February 10, 2007		at Cal Poly	L 80–89	11–15 (5–7)	Mott Gym (2,581); San Luis Obispo, CA
February 14, 2007		at UC Riverside	W 66–61	12–15 (6–7)	Student Recreation Center (684); Riverside, CA
February 17, 2007*		at San Francisco; Bracketbusters	L 62–76	12–16	War Memorial Gymnasium (1,224); San Francisco, CA
February 22, 2007*		UC Davis	W 73–59	13–16	Bren Events Center (2,479); Irvine, CA
March 1, 2007		at Long Beach State	L 80–85	13–17 (6–8)	Walter Pyramid (2,732); Long Beach, CA
Big West Conference tournament
March 7, 2007		vs. UC Riverside; First Round	W 53–52	14–17	Anaheim Convention Center (1,436); Anaheim, CA
March 8, 2007		vs. UC Santa Barbara; Quarterfinal	W 70–52	15–17	Anaheim Convention Center (2,393); Anaheim, CA
March 9, 2007		vs. Long Beach State; Semifinal	L 63–77	15–18	Anaheim Convention Center (4,252); Anaheim, CA
*Non-conference game. ^{#}Rankings from AP Poll. (#) Tournament seedings in parentheses. All times are in Pacific Time.

== Awards and honors ==
- Chad DeCasas
  - Big West All Freshman Team
- Michael Hunter
  - Big West All Freshman Team
