= 2007 Southland Conference men's basketball tournament =

- Classification: Division I
- Season: 2006–07
- Teams: 8
- Site: Campbell Center; Houston, Texas
- Champions: Texas A&M–Corpus Christi (1st title)
- Winning coach: Ronnie Arrow (1st title)
- MVP: Chris Daniels (Texas A&M–Corpus Christi)

2006–07 Southland Conference men's basketball standings
	Conf.				Overall
Team	W		L	PCT	W		L	PCT
East
Northwestern State	10	–	6	.625	17	–	15	.531
McNeese State	9	–	7	.563	15	–	17	.469
Southeastern Louisiana	8	–	8	.500	16	–	14	.533
Lamar	8	–	8	.500	15	–	17	.469
Nicholls State	7	–	9	.438	8	–	22	.267
Central Arkansas	4	–	12	.250	10	–	20	.333
West
Texas A&M–Corpus Christi †	14	–	2	.875	26	–	7	.788
Sam Houston State	13	–	3	.813	21	–	10	.677
Stephen F. Austin	8	–	8	.500	15	–	14	.517
Texas-Arlington	8	–	8	.500	13	–	17	.433
Texas State	4	–	12	.250	9	–	20	.310
UTSA	3	–	13	.188	7	–	22	.241
† 2007 Southland Conference tournament winner Rankings from AP Poll

The 2007 Southland Conference men's basketball tournament took place March 8–11, 2007, at the Campbell Center in Houston, Texas.

== Format ==
The top eight eligible men's basketball teams in the Southland Conference receive a berth in the conference tournament. After the conference season, teams are seeded by conference record.

== Bracket ==
Quarterfinals; March 8
2	Sam Houston State	98
7	Lamar	99
3	Northwestern State	85
6	Stephen F. Austin	76
1	Texas A&M–Corpus Christi	80
8	Southeastern Louisiana	72
4	McNeese State	77
5	Texas–Arlington	76

Semifinals; March 9
7	Lamar	65
3	Northwestern State	78
1	Texas A&M–Corpus Christi	87
4	McNeese State	66

Finals; March 11
1	Texas A&M–Corpus Christi	81
3	Northwestern State	78

== Championship game ==
Texas A&M-Corpus Christi defeated Northwestern State, 81–78 and never trailed in the game. They got 19 points from tournament MVP Chris Daniels. Daniels, the conference player of the year, was 7-for-8 despite being double- and sometimes triple-teamed. Corpus Christi led by eight at halftime.

It was 79–78 with five seconds remaining, and Northwestern State was forced to foul. Josh Ervin made two free throws to put Corpus Christi up three. Taureen Mitchell intercepted Northwestern's final pass to end the game. Trey Gilder led Northwestern State with 25 points, hitting all seven of his free throws and both of his three-point attempts.

== Sources ==
- Southland Conference archives
