= Ted Hotaling =

American college basketball coach

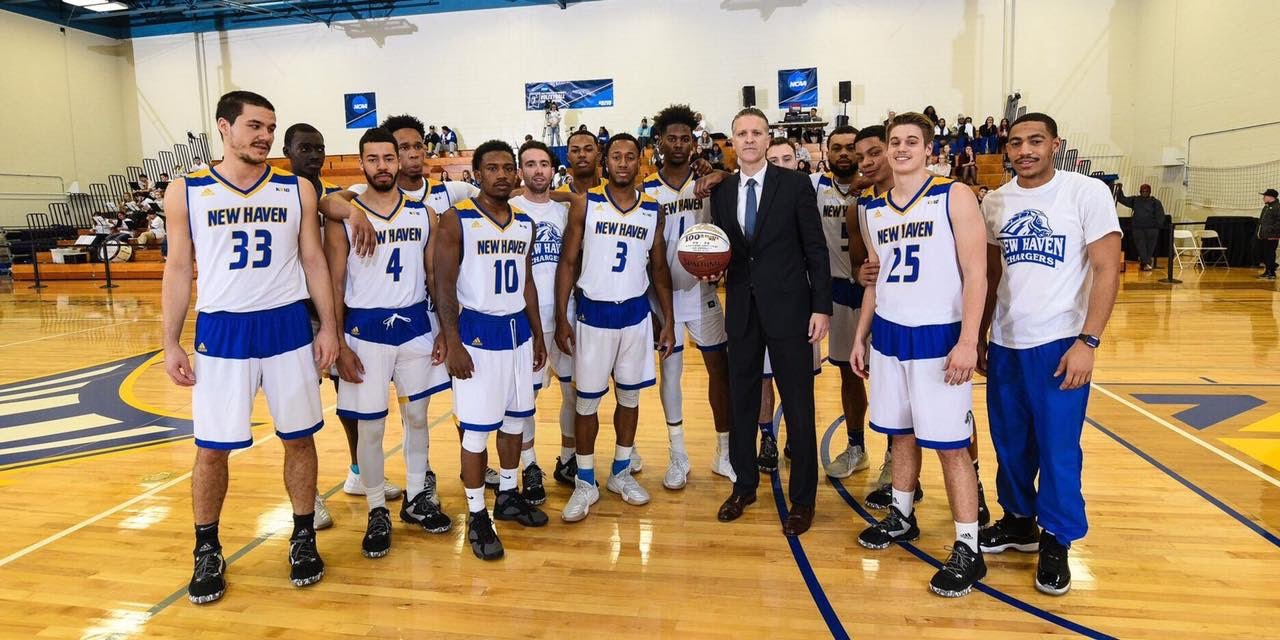

Current position
- Title: Head coach
- Team: New Haven
- Conference: NEC
- Record: 232–201 (.536)

Biographical details
- Born: July 12, 1972 (age 54); Hudson, New York, U.S.

Playing career
- 1991–1995: Albany
- 1995–1996: Plymouth Raiders
- 1996–1997: Cardiff Phoenix

Coaching career (HC unless noted)
- 1998–1999: Adelphi (assistant)
- 1999–2000: Yale (assistant)
- 2000–2001: New Haven (assistant)
- 2001–2005: Yale (assistant)
- 2005–2010: Eastern Kentucky (assistant)
- 2010–present: New Haven

Ted Hotaling (born July 12, 1972) is an American college basketball coach and the current head men's basketball coach at the University of New Haven (2010–present).

Born in upstate New York, Hotaling played at SUNY Albany for coach Richard Doc Sauers. Hotaling also played professional basketball in the National Basketball League (England) for the Cardiff Phoenix Basketball Club and the Plymouth Rotolok Raiders. In 2012, Hotaling was inducted into the SUNY Albany Athletics Hall of Fame as an individual player and as a member of the 1993–1994 men's basketball team who earned a berth in the NCAA Division III, Elite Eight. Hotaling was honored as a member of the Class of 2018 Upstate New York Basketball Hall of Fame on May 20, 2018.

== Coaching career ==
Hotaling was hired for the 1998-99 season at Adelphi University by Steve Clifford, the current head coach of the Charlotte Hornets. Hotaling spent the 1999–2000 season at Yale University under first-year head coach, James Jones. Next, Hotaling worked at New Haven as an assistant to Jay Young from 2000 to 2001. Hotaling returned to Yale University as an assistant to Jones from 2001 to 2005. In 2005, Jeff Neubauer tapped Hotaling to be his top assistant at EKU. Hotaling left EKU in 2010 to become the head coach of the New Haven Chargers men's basketball program. He is the second all-time winningest head coach in the history of the University of New Haven's men's basketball program and the only coach to lead the Chargers to the NCAA Division II Men's Basketball Elite 8.

== Head coaching record ==
Record table
| Season | Team | Overall | Conference | Standing | Postseason |
|---|---|---|---|---|---|
New Haven Chargers (Northeast-10 Conference) (2010–2025)
| 2010–11 | New Haven | 8–18 | 6–16 | 15th | |
| 2011–12 | New Haven | 15–13 | 10–12 | T-10th | |
| 2012–13 | New Haven | 20–9 | 16–6 | 4th | NCAA Division II Second Round |
| 2013–14 | New Haven | 21–9 | 14–6 | 2nd Southwest Division | NCAA Division II First Round |
| 2014–15 | New Haven | 15–12 | 10–10 | T-3rd Southwest Division | |
| 2015–16 | New Haven | 8–18 | 5–15 | 7th Southwest Division | |
| 2016–17 | New Haven | 15–14 | 9–11 | 5th Southwest Division | |
| 2017–18 | New Haven | 17–10 | 13–7 | 3rd Southwest Division | |
| 2018–19 | New Haven | 21–10 | 13–7 | 2nd Southwest Division | NCAA Division II Second Round |
| 2019–20 | New Haven | 15–15 | 10–9 | 5th Southwest Division | |
| 2021–22 | New Haven | 18–9 | 13–6 | 2nd Southwest Division | NCAA Division II Second Round |
| 2022–23 | New Haven | 23–11 | 13–7 | 4th | NCAA Division II Elite Eight |
| 2023–24 | New Haven | 10–19 | 7–15 | T–10th | |
| 2024–25 | New Haven | 12–17 | 7–13 | 8th | |
New Haven Chargers (NEC) (2025–present)
| 2025–26 | New Haven | 14–17 | 9–9 | 5th | |
| 2026–27 | New Haven | 0–0 | 0–0 | | |
| New Haven: | | 232–201 (.536) | 160–149 (.518) | | |
| Total: | | 232–201 (.536) | | | |
National champion Postseason invitational champion Conference regular season champion Conference regular season and conference tournament champion Division regular season champion Division regular season and conference tournament champion Conference tournament champion
