= List of Green Bay Phoenix men's basketball head coaches =

The following is a list of Green Bay Phoenix men's basketball head coaches. There have been 10 head coaches of the Phoenix in their 56-season history.

Green Bay's current head coach is Doug Gottlieb. He was hired as the Phoenix's head coach in May 2024, replacing Sundance Wicks, who was hired to fill the coaching vacancy of the Wyoming Cowboys after the departure of their previous coach Jeff Linder following the 2023-24 season.

No.	Tenure	Coach	Years	Record	Pct.
1	1969–1982	Dave Buss	13	271–102	.727
2	1982–1985	Dick Lien	3	22–62	.262
3	1985–1995	Dick Bennett	10	187–109	.632
4	1995–2002	Mike Heideman	7	110–95	.537
5	2002–2010	Tod Kowalczyk	8	136–112	.548
6	2010–2015	Brian Wardle	5	95–65	.594
7	2015–2020	Linc Darner	5	92–80	.535
8	2020–2023 (Note: Ryan was fired in January 2023. Freddie Owens was named interim coach for the remainder of the 2022–23 season.)	Will Ryan	3	15–61	.197
-	2023*	Freddie Owens	1	1–10	.091
9	2023–2024	Sundance Wicks	1	18–14	.563
10	2024–present	Doug Gottlieb	2	22–43	.338
Totals		10 coaches	57 seasons	969–753	.563
Records updated through end of 2024–25 season * - Denotes interim head coach. Source
