= Jeff Neubauer =

American basketball coach

Biographical details
- Born: January 27, 1971 (age 55); Gainesville, Florida, U.S.

Playing career
- 1989–1993: La Salle

Coaching career (HC unless noted)
- 1993–1996: The Citadel (assistant)
- 1996–2002: Richmond (assistant)
- 2002–2005: West Virginia (assistant)
- 2005–2015: Eastern Kentucky
- 2015–2021: Fordham

Head coaching record
- Overall: 249–238 (.511)
- Tournaments: 0–2 (NCAA Division I); 0–1 (CBI); 3–3 (CIT)

Accomplishments and honors

Championships
- 2 OVC tournament (2007, 2014); OVC East Division (2015)

Jeffrey Mark Neubauer (born January 27, 1971) is an American college basketball coach and the former head men's basketball coach at Fordham University. He was hired on March 30, 2015. He was fired on January 26, 2021. He is the former coach of Eastern Kentucky University.

== Playing career ==
Born in Gainesville, Florida, Neubauer played college basketball at La Salle University for head coach Speedy Morris. The 1989–90 Explorers went 30–2 and earned an NCAA tournament berth in Neubauer's freshman season. La Salle accumulated two more postseason berths and an overall record of 83–36 during his four years on the squad. Neubauer served as a team captain as a senior and earned honorable mention GTE All-Academic accolades as a cum laude graduate in finance in 1993.

== Head coaching record ==
Record table
| Season | Team | Overall | Conference | Standing | Postseason |
|---|---|---|---|---|---|
Eastern Kentucky Colonels (Ohio Valley Conference) (2005–2015)
| 2005–06 | Eastern Kentucky | 14–16 | 11–9 | T–5th | |
| 2006–07 | Eastern Kentucky | 21–12 | 13–7 | 2nd | NCAA Division I Round of 64 |
| 2007–08 | Eastern Kentucky | 14–16 | 10–10 | T–5th | |
| 2008–09 | Eastern Kentucky | 18–13 | 10–8 | 5th | |
| 2009–10 | Eastern Kentucky | 20–13 | 11–7 | 3rd | CBI First Round |
| 2010–11 | Eastern Kentucky | 15–16 | 9–9 | 6th | |
| 2011–12 | Eastern Kentucky | 16–16 | 7–9 | 8th | |
| 2012–13 | Eastern Kentucky | 25–10 | 12–4 | 2nd (East) | CIT Second Round |
| 2013–14 | Eastern Kentucky | 24–10 | 11–5 | 2nd (East) | NCAA Division I Round of 64 |
| 2014–15 | Eastern Kentucky | 21–12 | 11–5 | T–1st (East) | CIT Quarterfinal |
| Eastern Kentucky: | | 188–134 (.584) | 105–73 (.590) | | |
Fordham Rams (Atlantic 10 Conference) (2015–2021)
| 2015–16 | Fordham | 17–14 | 8–10 | 8th | CIT First Round |
| 2016–17 | Fordham | 13–19 | 7–11 | 10th | |
| 2017–18 | Fordham | 9–22 | 4–14 | 14th | |
| 2018–19 | Fordham | 12–20 | 3–15 | 14th | |
| 2019–20 | Fordham | 9–22 | 2–16 | T–13th | |
| 2020–21 | Fordham | 1–7 | 1–7 | | |
| Fordham: | | 61–104 (.370) | 25–73 (.255) | | |
| Total: | | 249–238 (.511) | | | |
National champion Postseason invitational champion Conference regular season champion Conference regular season and conference tournament champion Division regular season champion Division regular season and conference tournament champion Conference tournament champion
