= 2006–07 Belmont Bruins men's basketball team =

American college basketball season

2006–07 Belmont Bruins men's basketball

Atlantic Sun tournament champion

NCAA tournament, Round of 64
- Conference: Atlantic Sun Conference
- Record: 23–10 (14–4 A-Sun)
- Head coach: Rick Byrd (21st season)
- Assistant coaches: Casey Alexander; Brian Ayers; Roger Idstrom
- Home arena: Curb Event Center

2006–07 Atlantic Sun men's basketball standings
	Conf.				Overall
Team	W		L	PCT	W		L	PCT
East Tennessee State	16	–	2	.889	24	–	10	.706
Belmont †	14	–	4	.778	23	–	10	.697
Lipscomb	11	–	7	.611	18	–	13	.581
Jacksonville	11	–	7	.611	15	–	14	.517
Kennesaw State	9	–	9	.500	13	–	18	.419
Mercer	8	–	10	.444	13	–	17	.433
Campbell	7	–	11	.389	14	–	17	.452
Gardner–Webb	7	–	11	.389	9	–	21	.300
Stetson	6	–	12	.333	11	–	20	.355
North Florida	1	–	17	.056	3	–	26	.103
† 2007 Atlantic Sun Tournament winner As of March 6, 2007; Rankings from AP Poll

The 2006–07 Belmont Bruins men's basketball team represented Belmont University in the 2006–07 NCAA Division I men's basketball season. The Bruins, led by head coach Rick Byrd, played their home games at the Curb Event Center in Nashville, Tennessee, as members of the Atlantic Sun Conference. After finishing 2nd in the conference regular season standings, the Bruins won the Atlantic Sun tournament to earn an automatic bid to the NCAA tournament as the 15th seed in the East region. Belmont was beaten by 2nd seed Georgetown in the first round, 80–55.

== Roster ==
2006–07 Belmont Bruins men's basketball team
Players
Coaches

Pos.	#	Name	Height	Weight	Year	Hometown
G/F	2	Shane Dansby	6 ft 2 in (1.88 m)	210 lb (95 kg)	So	Pegram, Tennessee
F	3	Keaton Belcher	6 ft 9 in (2.06 m)	205 lb (93 kg)	Fr	Butler, Kentucky
G	4	Josh Goodwin	6 ft 3 in (1.91 m)	205 lb (93 kg)	Sr	Pegram, Tennessee
G	12	Alex Renfroe	6 ft 2 in (1.88 m)	160 lb (73 kg)	Jr	Hermitage, Tennessee
G/F	14	Andrew House	6 ft 4 in (1.93 m)	200 lb (91 kg)	So	Nashville, Tennessee
G	20	Andy Wicke	6 ft 2 in (1.88 m)	195 lb (88 kg)	So	Hendersonville, Tennessee
G/F	21	Jordan Campbell	6 ft 5 in (1.96 m)	195 lb (88 kg)	Fr	Indianapolis, Indiana
C	23	Mike Dejworek	6 ft 11 in (2.11 m)	235 lb (107 kg)	Fr	Ulm, Germany
G	24	Justin Hare	6 ft 2 in (1.88 m)	195 lb (88 kg)	Jr	Cleveland, Tennessee
F	25	Patrick Brand	6 ft 5 in (1.96 m)	225 lb (102 kg)	So	Indianapolis, Indiana
F	30	Matthew Dotson	6 ft 8 in (2.03 m)	220 lb (100 kg)	So	Centerville, Tennessee
C	32	Boomer Herndon	6 ft 10 in (2.08 m)	255 lb (116 kg)	Sr	Nashville, Tennessee
F	33	Will Peeples	6 ft 5 in (1.96 m)	220 lb (100 kg)	So	Little Rock, Arkansas
G	40	Henry Harris	6 ft 1 in (1.85 m)	170 lb (77 kg)	So	Nashville, Tennessee
C	45	Andrew Preston	6 ft 10 in (2.08 m)	210 lb (95 kg)	Sr	Winchester, Kentucky

Head coach

- Rick Byrd (Tennessee)

Assistant coach(es)

- Casey Alexander (Belmont)
- Brian Ayers (Lipscomb)
- Roger Idstrom (Mars Hill)

Legend

- (C) Team captain
- (S) Suspended
- (I) Ineligible
- (W) Walk-on
- Injured
- Current redshirt

Roster
Last update: April 30, 2022

== Schedule and results ==
Date time, TV	Rank^{#}	Opponent^{#}	Result	Record	Site city, state
Regular season
November 13, 2006*		vs. UNC Wilmington; NIT Season Tip-Off	L 83–88	0–1	Gaylord Entertainment Center (3,186); Nashville, TN
November 14, 2006*		vs. Fordham; NIT Season Tip-Off	W 56–49	1–1	Gaylord Entertainment Center (1,388); Nashville, TN
November 18, 2006*		at IUPUI	W 67–61	2–1	IUPUI Gymnasium (1,218); Indianapolis, IN
November 20, 2006*		Fisk	W 83–54	3–1	Curb Event Center (1,021); Nashville, TN
November 27, 2006*		at Middle Tennessee	L 57–64	3–2	Murphy Center (3,110); Murfreesboro, TN
November 30, 2006		North Florida	W 87–32	4–2 (1–0)	Curb Event Center (743); Nashville, TN
December 2, 2006		Jacksonville	W 76–62	5–2 (2–0)	Curb Event Center (810); Nashville, TN
December 4, 2006*		IUPUI	W 76–66	6–2	Curb Event Center (665); Nashville, TN
December 13, 2006*		at Arkansas–Little Rock	W 72–51	7–2	Jack Stephens Center (3,118); Little Rock, AR
December 17, 2006*		at Illinois	L 51–77	7–3	Assembly Hall (16,618); Champaign, IL
December 19, 2006*		at Michigan State	L 58–67	7–4	Breslin Center (14,759); Lansing, MI
December 28, 2006*		vs. Rice; Shamrock Office Solutions Classic	W 87–85	8–4	McKeon Pavilion; Moraga, CA
December 29, 2006*		at Saint Mary's (CA); Shamrock Office Solutions Classic	L 60–71	8–5	McKeon Pavilion (1,761); Moraga, CA
January 2, 2007		at East Tennessee State	W 75–74 ^{OT}	9–5 (3–0)	Memorial Center (4,054); Johnson City, TN
January 4, 2007		at Kennesaw State	W 63–45	10–5 (4–0)	KSU Convocation Center (965); Kennesaw, GA
January 7, 2007		Mercer	W 72–47	11–5 (5–0)	Curb Event Center (1,007); Nashville, TN
January 9, 2007		Stetson	W 73–71	12–5 (6–0)	Curb Event Center (891); Nashville, TN
January 12, 2007		Lipscomb; Battle of the Boulevard	L 50–55	12–6 (6–1)	Curb Event Center (5,074); Nashville, TN
January 18, 2007		at Campbell	L 67–79	12–7 (6–2)	Carter Gymnasium (858); Buies Creek, NC
January 20, 2007		at Gardner–Webb	W 70–54	13–7 (7–2)	Paul Porter Arena (2,450); Boiling Springs, NC
January 25, 2007		East Tennessee State	W 80–70 ^{OT}	13–8 (7–3)	Curb Event Center (1,201); Nashville, TN
January 27, 2007		Kennesaw State	W 85–66	14–8 (8–3)	Curb Event Center (1,264); Nashville, TN
February 1, 2007		at Stetson	W 62–58	15–8 (9–3)	Edmunds Center (1,841); DeLand, FL
February 3, 2007		at Mercer	W 84–77	16–8 (10–3)	University Center (1,343); Macon, GA
February 9, 2007		at Lipscomb; Battle of the Boulevard	L 60–70	16–9 (10–4)	Allen Arena (5,289); Nashville, TN
February 15, 2007		Gardner–Webb	W 87–55	17–9 (11–4)	Curb Event Center (805); Nashville, TN
February 17, 2007		Campbell	W 92–68	18–9 (12–4)	Curb Event Center (1,379); Nashville, TN
February 22, 2007		at Jacksonville	W 86–71	19–9 (13–4)	Jacksonville Veterans Memorial Arena (1,945); Jacksonville, FL
February 24, 2007		at North Florida	W 74–54	20–9 (14–4)	UNF Arena (436); Jacksonville, FL
Atlantic Sun tournament
March 1, 2007	(2)	vs. (7) Gardner–Webb; Atlantic Sun Quarterfinals	W 79–61	21–9	Memorial Center; Johnson City, TN
March 2, 2007	(2)	vs. (6) Campbell; Atlantic Sun Semifinals	W 79–63	22–9	Memorial Center (5,574); Johnson City, TN
March 3, 2007	(2)	at (1) East Tennessee State; Atlantic Sun Championship	W 94–67	23–9	Memorial Center (6,151); Johnson City, TN
NCAA tournament
March 15, 2007	(15 E)	vs. (2 E) No. 8 Georgetown; NCAA First Round	L 55–80	23–10	Lawrence Joel Veterans Memorial Coliseum; Winston-Salem, NC
*Non-conference game. ^{#}Rankings from AP Poll. (#) Tournament seedings in parentheses.
