= 2006–07 Texas A&M–Corpus Christi Islanders men's basketball team =

American college basketball season

2006–07 Texas A&M–Corpus Christi Islanders men's basketball

Southland Regular season and tournament champions

NCAA tournament, first round
- Conference: Southland Conference
- West
- Record: 26–7 (14–2 Southland)
- Head coach: Ronnie Arrow (8th season)
- Home arena: American Bank Center

2006–07 Southland Conference men's basketball standings
	Conf.				Overall
Team	W		L	PCT	W		L	PCT
East
Northwestern State	10	–	6	.625	17	–	15	.531
McNeese State	9	–	7	.563	15	–	17	.469
Southeastern Louisiana	8	–	8	.500	16	–	14	.533
Lamar	8	–	8	.500	15	–	17	.469
Nicholls State	7	–	9	.438	8	–	22	.267
Central Arkansas	4	–	12	.250	10	–	20	.333
West
Texas A&M–Corpus Christi †	14	–	2	.875	26	–	7	.788
Sam Houston State	13	–	3	.813	21	–	10	.677
Stephen F. Austin	8	–	8	.500	15	–	14	.517
Texas-Arlington	8	–	8	.500	13	–	17	.433
Texas State	4	–	12	.250	9	–	20	.310
UTSA	3	–	13	.188	7	–	22	.241
† 2007 Southland Conference tournament winner Rankings from AP Poll

The 2006–07 Texas A&M–Corpus Christi Islanders men's basketball team represented Texas A&M University–Corpus Christi in the 2006–07 NCAA Division I men's basketball season. The Islanders, led by eighth-year head coach Ronnie Arrow, competed as members of the Southland Conference. They played most of their home games at American Bank Center in Corpus Christi, Texas. They finished the season 26–7, 14–2 in Southland play to atop the conference standings. As the No. 1 seed, they defeated Southeastern Louisiana, McNeese State, and Northwestern State to win the Southland tournament. They received the conference’s automatic bid to the NCAA tournament as the No. 15 seed in the Midwest Region, where they lost in the opening round to Wisconsin. This was the program's first appearance in the NCAA Tournament.

== Roster ==
2006–07 Texas A&M–Corpus Christi Islanders men's basketball team
Players
Coaches

Pos.	#	Name	Height	Weight	Year	Hometown
G	12	Josh Ervin	6 ft 1 in (1.85 m)	185 lb (84 kg)	Sr	Houston, TX
G	20	Taurean Mitchell	6 ft 1 in (1.85 m)	190 lb (86 kg)	Sr	Corpus Christi, TX
C	54	Chris Daniels	7 ft 0 in (2.13 m)	265 lb (120 kg)	Jr	San Antonio, TX

Head coach

- Ronnie Arrow (Texas State)

Assistant coach(es)

Legend

- (C) Team captain
- (S) Suspended
- (I) Ineligible
- (W) Walk-on
- Injured
- Current redshirt

Roster

== Schedule and results ==
Date time, TV	Rank^{#}	Opponent^{#}	Result	Record	Site (attendance) city, state
Exhibition
Nov 8, 2006*; 7:00 p.m.		Texas A&M International	W 74–64		American Bank Center; Corpus Christi, Texas
Nov 13, 2006*; 7:00 p.m.		Texas A&M–Kingsville	W 80–61		American Bank Center; Corpus Christi, Texas
Non-conference Regular season
Nov 16, 2006*; 7:00 p.m.		Texas College	W 90–53	1–0	American Bank Center (1,855); Corpus Christi, Texas
Nov 20, 2006*; 7:00 p.m.		Monmouth	W 71–54	2–0	American Bank Center (2,065); Corpus Christi, Texas
Nov 25, 2006*; 3:05 p.m.		at Detroit	W 82–73	3–0	Calihan Hall (1,852); Detroit, Michigan
Nov 29, 2006*; 7:00 p.m.		at Oklahoma State	L 73–95	3–1	Gallagher-Iba Arena (13,090); Stillwater, Oklahoma
Dec 2, 2006*; 2:00 p.m.		at Mississippi State	L 72–96	3–2	Humphrey Coliseum (8,720); Starkville, Mississippi
Dec 9, 2006*; 7:00 p.m.		Huston-Tillotson	W 87–59	4–2	American Bank Center (2,063); Corpus Christi, Texas
Dec 17, 2006*; 9:30 p.m.		at UNLV	L 57–67	4–3	Thomas & Mack Center (8,041); Las Vegas, Nevada
Dec 18, 2006*; 7:00 p.m.		vs. South Florida	W 69–63	5–3	Thomas & Mack Center (500); Las Vegas, Nevada
Dec 19, 2006*; 7:00 p.m.		vs. Norfolk State	W 98–82	6–3	Thomas & Mack Center (500); Las Vegas, Nevada
Dec 22, 2006*; 6:00 p.m.		at Purdue	L 61–79	6–4	Mackey Arena (7,799); West Lafayette, Indiana
Dec 29, 2006*; 7:30 p.m.		Howard	W 75–57	7–4	American Bank Center (1,652); Corpus Christi, Texas
Dec 30, 2006*; 7:30 p.m.		Brown	W 71–57	8–4	American Bank Center (2,007); Corpus Christi, Texas
Jan 2, 2007*; 7:00 p.m.		Kent State	W 81–73	9–4	American Bank Center (1,630); Corpus Christi, Texas
Southland Conference season
Jan 6, 2007; 3:00 p.m.		McNeese State	W 74–62	10–4 (1–0)	American Bank Center (3,536); Corpus Christi, Texas
Jan 11, 2007; 6:30 p.m.		at Northwestern State	W 69–57	11–4 (2–0)	Prather Coliseum (2,316); Natchitoches, Louisiana
Jan 13, 2007; 6:00 p.m.		at Central Arkansas	W 85–73	12–4 (3–0)	Farris Center (1,080); Conway, Arkansas
Jan 18, 2007; 7:00 p.m.		Texas State	W 90–42	13–4 (4–0)	American Bank Center (3,083); Corpus Christi, Texas
Jan 20, 2007; 7:00 p.m.		at UT Arlington	W 89–63	14–4 (5–0)	Texas Hall (553); Arlington, Texas
Jan 28, 2007; 6:00 p.m.		at Texas–San Antonio	W 78–63	15–4 (6–0)	Convocation Center (1,571); San Antonio, Texas
Jan 31, 2007; 7:00 p.m.		at Stephen F. Austin	W 70–62	16–4 (7–0)	Johnson Coliseum (2,313); Nacogdoches, Texas
Feb 3, 2007; 7:00 p.m.		Sam Houston State	L 79–84	16–5 (7–1)	American Bank Center (5,101); Corpus Christi, Texas
Feb 8, 2007; 7:00 p.m.		Nicholls	W 107–91	17–5 (8–1)	American Bank Center (2,994); Corpus Christi, Texas
Feb 10, 2007; 11:14 a.m.		Southeastern Louisiana	W 80–74	18–5 (9–1)	American Bank Center (2,029); Corpus Christi, Texas
Feb 15, 2007; 7:00 p.m.		at Texas State	W 99–89	19–5 (10–1)	Strahan Coliseum (1,492); San Marcos, Texas
Feb 19, 2007; 7:00 p.m.		UT Arlington	W 91–72	20–5 (11–1)	American Bank Center (3,178); Corpus Christi, Texas
Feb 22, 2007; 7:05 p.m.		at Lamar	L 77–78	21–6 (11–2)	Montagne Center (3,448); Beaumont, Texas
Feb 24, 2007; 12:00 p.m.		Texas–San Antonio	W 75–59	22–6 (12–2)	American Bank Center (2,457); Corpus Christi, Texas
Feb 28, 2007; 7:00 p.m.		Stephen F. Austin	W 69–65	23–6 (13–2)	American Bank Center (3,328); Corpus Christi, Texas
Mar 1, 2007; 5:00 p.m.		at Sam Houston State	W 85–68	24–6 (14–2)	Bernard Johnson Coliseum (3,868); Huntsville, Texas
Southland tournament
Mar 8, 2007*; 6:00 p.m.	(1)	vs. (8) Southeastern Louisiana; Quarterfinals	W 80–72	24–6	Campbell Center; Houston, Texas
Mar 9, 2007*; 8:30 p.m.	(1)	vs. (4) McNeese State; Semifinals	W 87–66	25–6	Campbell Center (1,466); Houston, Texas
Mar 11, 2007*; 1:00 p.m.	(1)	vs. (3) Northwestern State; Championship game	W 81–78	26–6	Campbell Center (1,811); Houston, Texas
NCAA tournament
Mar 16, 2007*; 1:55 p.m., CBS	(15 MW)	vs. (2 MW) No. 6 Wisconsin; First Round	L 63–76	26–7	United Center (18,237); Chicago, Illinois
*Non-conference game. ^{#}Rankings from AP Poll. (#) Tournament seedings in parentheses. MW=Midwest. All times are in Central.

== Awards and honors ==
- Chris Daniels – Southland Conference Player of the Year
