= Edward Weidner =

American educator and public administration scholar (1921-2007)

- Born: July 7, 1921
- Died: June 6, 2007 (aged 85)
- Education: University of Minnesota College of Liberal Arts
- Occupations: Educator, public administration scholar

Edward Weidner (July 7, 1921 – June 6, 2007) was an American educator and public administration scholar. He was known as the founder of the University of Wisconsin–Green Bay Weidner Center.

Weidner died on June 6, 2007, at the age of 85.
