= Dick Perry =

American coach and athletics administrator

Biographical details
- Born: July 13, 1929; Long Beach, California, U.S.
- Died: October 19, 2014 (aged 85); Riverside, California, U.S.

Coaching career (HC unless noted)

Men's basketball
- 1951–1953: Mayetta HS (KS)
- 1953–1955: St. John HS (KS)
- 1955–1956: Hays HS (KS)
- 1956–1958: College of Emporia
- 1958–1960: Long Beach State (assistant)
- 1960–1967: Long Beach State

Administrative career (AD unless noted)
- 1975–1984: USC
- 1987–1992: UC Riverside

Head coaching record
- Overall: 82–96 (.461)

Richard Herbert Perry (July 13, 1929 – October 19, 2014) was an American coach and administrator who was the Long Beach State men's basketball coach from 1960 to 1967 and athletic director at USC from 1975 to 1984 and UC Riverside from 1987 to 1992.

== Playing and coaching ==
A standout basketball player at Woodrow Wilson Classical High School in Long Beach, California, Perry attended the College of Emporia, where he lettered in basketball four years and two years each in football, baseball, and track. After graduating, he coached high school basketball in Mayetta, St. John, and Hays, Kansas. He returned to CoE in 1956 as basketball and baseball coach.

In 1958, Perry became the assistant men's basketball coach and freshman football coach at Long Beach State. In 1960, he was promoted to head basketball coach. He coached Long Beach's first three basketball stars – John Rambo, Dave Jones, and Bill Florentine. From 1960 to 1967, Perry compiled an overall record of 82–96.

== Administration ==
In 1967, Perry completed his PhD at the University of Southern California and was offered a position on the faculty. He was an associate professor of physical education and was president of the faculty senate from 1974 to 1975.

Perry became USC's athletic director in 1975 after John McKay resigned to become head coach of the Tampa Bay Buccaneers. Under Perry, the Trojans men's teams won eight national titles in six sports (football, baseball, swimming, tennis, and volleyball). The women's teams captured twelve national championships in three sports (basketball, tennis and volleyball). However, the performance of the men's teams slipped following its volleyball title in 1978. After a 4-6-1 1983 football season, USC president James Zumberge formed an advisory council to study the athletic program and make recommendations. It was reported that the council recommended removing Perry. He resigned effective July 1, 1984 and returned to his former position in the physical education department.

In 1987, Perry became the athletic director at UC Riverside. As AD, he worked to improve the school's athletic facilities, sought to increase community involvement in the athletic program, and brought local business leaders together in an unsuccessful attempt to move UCR to NCAA Division I. He retired in 1992.

== Later life ==
Perry remained involved in civic endeavors in Riverside, which included serving as president of the executive board of the Riverside Sport Hall of Fame. He died on October 19, 2014 of a stroke and heart attack.
