= Meredith Smith =

American basketball coach (born 1942)

Biographical details
- Born: July 28, 1942 (age 84)
- Died: November 26, 2021; Baltimore, Maryland, U.S.

Coaching career (HC unless noted)
- 1978–2002: Southern HS
- 2004–2007: Maryland Eastern Shore (assistant)
- 2007–2008: Maryland Eastern Shore

Meredith Smith (born July 28, 1942) was the head men's basketball coach at the University of Maryland Eastern Shore from 2007 to 2008. He replaced Larry Lessett in 2007.

Smith is an alumnus of UMES, having graduated in 1964.
