= Larry Reynolds =

American college basketball coach

Current position
- Title: Head coach
- Team: Stanislaus State
- Conference: CCAA

Playing career
- 1972–1976: UC Riverside

Coaching career (HC unless noted)
- 1979–1995: UC Riverside (assistant)
- 1995–1997: San Francisco (assistant)
- 1997–2002: Cal State San Bernardino
- 2002–2007: Long Beach State
- 2009–present: Stanislaus State

Accomplishments and honors

Awards
- 4× CCAA Coach of the Year (1999–2002)

Larry Reynolds is an American college basketball coach, currently co-head coach at NCAA Division II Stanislaus State. Reynolds has previously been head coach at Cal State San Bernardino and Division I Long Beach State.

Reynolds played college basketball from UC Riverside, where he was named the California Collegiate Athletic Association (CCAA) Player of the Year in 1975. He began his coaching career at his alma mater, serving as an assistant coach to John Masi from 1979 to 1995. He moved up to the Division I University of San Francisco as an assistant, then secured his first head coaching job at Cal State San Bernardino in 1997. Reynolds led the Coyotes to a five-year record of 110–35 (.759), including four consecutive NCAA tournament appearances and four consecutive CCAA Coach of the Year awards. In 2001–02, Reynolds led the team to a 28–2 record.

He parlayed the season's success into a move to Division I, taking the reins at Long Beach State. Reynolds was at Long Beach for five seasons, amassing a record of 63–83. In his last season, Reynolds and Big West Conference Player of the Year Aaron Nixon won both the conference regular season and tournament championships. However, Long Beach State found NCAA violations occurring on Reynolds watch and following the 2006–07 season, Reynolds was fired.

In 2009, Reynolds was hired as head coach at California State University, Stanislaus (Stanislaus State). In 2017, it was announced that Reynolds was suffering from Parkinson's disease and that the school would hire a co-head coach to reduce his workload. Ultimately the school hired Paul Trevor of San Francisco State.
