= 2007 Pacific-10 Conference men's basketball tournament =

- Classification: Division I
- Season: 2006–07
- Teams: 10
- Site: Staples Center; Los Angeles, California, USA
- Champions: Oregon (2nd title)
- Winning coach: Ernie Kent (2nd title)
- MVP: Tajuan Porter (Oregon)
- Attendance: 84,477
- Top scorer: Ryan Anderson (California) (62 points)

2006–07 Pacific-10 Conference men's basketball standings
	Conf.				Overall
Team	W		L	PCT	W		L	PCT
No. 7 UCLA	15	–	3	.833	30	–	6	.833
No. 13 Washington State	13	–	5	.722	26	–	8	.765
No. 23 USC^{1}	11	–	7	.611	25	–	12	.676
No. 10 Oregon†^{2}	11	–	7	.611	29	–	8	.784
Arizona	11	–	7	.611	20	–	11	.645
Stanford	10	–	8	.556	18	–	13	.581
Washington	8	–	10	.444	19	–	13	.594
California	6	–	12	.333	16	–	17	.485
Oregon State	3	–	15	.167	11	–	21	.344
Arizona State	2	–	16	.111	8	–	22	.267
† Conference tournament winner As of March 18, 2007; Rankings from AP poll^{1} Holds tie-breaker, ^{2} Holds second tie-breaker.

The 2007 Pacific Life Pacific-10 Conference men's basketball tournament was played between March 7 and March 10, 2007, at Staples Center in Los Angeles, California, United States. The champion of the tournament was Oregon, which received the Pac-10's automatic bid to the NCAA tournament. The Most Outstanding Player was Tajuan Porter of Oregon.

== Seeds ==
All Pacific-10 schools play in the tournament. Teams are seeded by conference record, with a tiebreaker system used to seed teams with identical conference records.

Seed	School	Conference (Overall)	Tiebreaker
1	UCLA	15–3 (26–4)	
2	Washington State	13–5 (24–6)	
3	USC	11–7 (21–10)	4–0 vs. ORE,
4	Oregon	11–7 (23–7)	1–3 vs. USC, ARIZ
5	Arizona	11–7 (20–9)	1–3 vs. USC, ORE
6	Stanford	10–8 (18–11)	
7	Washington	8–10 (18–12)	
8	California	6–12 (14–16)	
9	Oregon State	3–15 (11–20)	
10	Arizona State	2–16 (8–21)	

== Bracket ==
Play-in Round (March 7)
8	California	70
9	Oregon State	51
7	Washington	59
10	Arizona State	51

Quarterfinals (March 8)
1	#4 UCLA	69
8	California	76*
4	#16 Oregon	69
5	Arizona	50
3	USC	83*
6	Stanford	79
2	#11 Washington State	74
7	Washington	64

Semifinals (March 9)
8	California	63
4	#16 Oregon	81
3	USC	70
2	#11 Washington State	61

Final (March 10)
4	#16 Oregon	81
3	USC	57

Asterisks denote overtime period.

== Tournament notes ==
- This was the first time since 2003 that neither of the top two seeds made the final.
- Oregon's 24-point win over USC was the 2nd largest margin of victory for the championship game in this tournament's history. (The largest since a 26-point margin by Arizona in 1988).
- Cal's appearance in the semifinals was the best performance for a #8 seed, since Arizona St. had made it to the semifinals in 1990.
- Arch-rivals Washington and Washington St. met for the first time ever in the tournament (second round). This was the first meeting in five years for any arch-rival pair.

== All tournament team ==
- Tajuan Porter, Oregon – Tournament MVP
- Bryce Taylor, Oregon
- Aaron Brooks, Oregon
- Gabe Pruitt, USC
- Taj Gibson, USC
- Ryan Anderson, California
