= 2006–07 Oregon Ducks men's basketball team =

American college basketball season

2006–07 Oregon Ducks men's basketball

Pacific-10 tournament champions

NCAA tournament, Elite Eight
- Conference: Pacific-10 Conference

Ranking
- Coaches: No. 8
- AP: No. 10
- Record: 29–8 (11–7 Pac-10)
- Head coach: Ernie Kent
- Assistant coaches: Mark Hudson; Kenny Payne
- Home arena: McArthur Court

2006–07 Pacific-10 Conference men's basketball standings
	Conf.				Overall
Team	W		L	PCT	W		L	PCT
No. 7 UCLA	15	–	3	.833	30	–	6	.833
No. 13 Washington State	13	–	5	.722	26	–	8	.765
No. 23 USC^{1}	11	–	7	.611	25	–	12	.676
No. 10 Oregon†^{2}	11	–	7	.611	29	–	8	.784
Arizona	11	–	7	.611	20	–	11	.645
Stanford	10	–	8	.556	18	–	13	.581
Washington	8	–	10	.444	19	–	13	.594
California	6	–	12	.333	16	–	17	.485
Oregon State	3	–	15	.167	11	–	21	.344
Arizona State	2	–	16	.111	8	–	22	.267
† Conference tournament winner As of March 18, 2007; Rankings from AP poll^{1} Holds tie-breaker, ^{2} Holds second tie-breaker.

The 2006–07 Oregon Ducks experienced what many would argue as one of their most memorable and successful seasons in school history. Freshman Tajuan Porter, who was not heavily recruited, along with senior and leader Aaron Brooks helped lead the Ducks to a successful season. They began their season by completing their non-conference schedule at a perfect 12–0, including a come-from-behind win at Rice and an important east-coast win at then ranked #19 Georgetown. The Ducks suffered their first loss of the season against USC but were able to bounce back and defeat then ranked #1 UCLA marking the second time in school history the Ducks had defeated a #1 Bruins team. Towards the end of the season Oregon suffered a streak in which they lost 6 of 8 games, the skid dropped the Ducks from #7 to #23 in the AP Poll. However the Ducks managed to bounce back, winning 9 games in a row, including a sweep of the Pac-10 Championship Tournament – in dominating fashion – first round wins over Miami University (Ohio), Winthrop University, and a Sweet Sixteen victory over UNLV. Their final game of the season was a 77–85 loss to eventual NCAA Men's Basketball Tournament champions, Florida.

The team also featured Malik Hairston, who was drafted in 2008.

== Schedule ==
Date time, TV	Rank^{#}	Opponent^{#}	Result	Record	Site (attendance) city, state
11/10/2006*		Lehigh	W 77–65	1–0	McArthur Court; Eugene, OR
11/11/2006*		Cal State Northridge	W 84–73	2–0	McArthur Court; Eugene, OR
11/12/2006*		Portland State	W 116–68	3–0	McArthur Court; Eugene, OR
11/17/2006*		UC-Irvine	W 85–42	4–0	McArthur Court; Eugene, OR
11/20/2006*		at Rice	W 79–73 ^{OT}	5–0	Tudor Fieldhouse; Houston, TX
11/29/2006*		at No. 18 Georgetown	W 57–50	6–0	Verizon Center; Washington, D.C.
12/9/2006*		vs. Nebraska	W 68–56	7–0	Rose Garden; Portland, OR
12/11/2006*		Bethune-Cookman	W 92–64	8–0	McArthur Court; Eugene, OR
12/15/2006*	No. 22	Eastern Washington	W 100–74	9–0	McArthur Court; Eugene, OR
12/17/2006*	No. 22	Idaho State	W 100–74	10–0	McArthur Court; Eugene, OR
12/23/2006*	No. 21	Mercer	W 84–64	11–0	McArthur Court; Eugene, OR
12/28/2006*	No. 20	Portland	W 76–49	12–0	McArthur Court; Eugene, OR
12/30/2006	No. 20	at Oregon State; Civil War	W 76–73	13–0	Gill Coliseum; Corvallis, OR
01/04/2007	No. 16	USC	L 82–84	13–1	McArthur Court; Eugene, OR
01/06/2007	No. 16	No. 1 UCLA	W 68–66	14–1	McArthur Court; Eugene, OR
01/11/2007	No. 15	at Arizona State	W 60–55	15–1	Wells Fargo Arena; Tempe, AZ
01/14/2007	No. 15	at No. 10 Arizona	W 79–77	16–1	McKale Center; Tucson, AZ
01/18/2007	No. 9	Stanford	W 66–59	17–1	Maples Pavilion; Stanford, CA
01/20/2007	No. 9	California	W 92–84	18–1	McArthur Court; Eugene, OR
01/25/2007	No. 7	at Washington	L 77–89	18–2	Bank of America Arena; Seattle, WA
01/27/2007	No. 7	at No. 20 Washington State	W 77–74 ^{OT}	19–2	Friel Court; Pullman, WA
02/01/2007	No. 9	at No. 5 UCLA	L 57–69	19–3	Pauley Pavilion; Los Angeles
02/03/2007	No. 9	at USC	L 68–71	19–4	Galen Center; Los Angeles
02/08/2007	No. 13	Arizona State	W 55–51	20–4	McArthur Court; Eugene, OR
02/10/2007	No. 13	No. 24 Arizona	L 74–77	20–5	McArthur Court; Eugene, OR
02/15/2007	No. 15	at California	L 61–63	20–6	Haas Pavilion; Berkeley, CA
02/17/2007	No. 15	at Stanford	L 69–88	20–7	Maples Pavilion; Stanford, CA
02/22/2007	No. 23	No. 9 Washington State	W 64–59	21–7	McArthur Court; Eugene, OR
02/24/2007	No. 23	Washington	W 93–85	22–7	McArthur Court; Eugene, OR
03/03/2007	No. 17	Oregon State; Civil War	W 78–69	23–7	McArthur Court; Eugene, OR
Pac-10 tournament
03/08/2007	(4)	vs. (5) Arizona; Pac-10 Conference tournament quarterfinal	W 69–50	24–7	Staples Center (16,318); Los Angeles
03/09/2007	(4)	vs. (8) California; Pac-10 Conference tournament quarterfinal	W 81–63	25–7	Staples Center (18,196); Los Angeles
03/10/2007	(4)	vs. (3) USC; Pac-10 Conference tournament final	W 81–57	26–7	Staples Center (18,259); Los Angeles
NCAA tournament
03/16/2007*; CBS	(3 MW)	vs. (14 MW) Miami (OH); First Round	W 58–56	27–7	Spokane Veterans Memorial Arena (11,551); Spokane, WA
03/18/2007*; CBS	(3 MW)	vs. (11 MW) Winthrop; Second Round	W 75–61	28–7	Spokane Veterans Memorial Arena (11,551); Spokane, WA
03/23/2007*; CBS	(3 MW)	vs. (7 MW) UNLV; Sweet Sixteen	W 76–72	29–7	Edward Jones Dome (26,307); St. Louis, MO
03/25/2007*; CBS	(3 MW)	vs. (1 MW) Florida; Elite Eight	L 77–85	29–8	Edward Jones Dome (25,947); St. Louis, MO
*Non-conference game. ^{#}Rankings from AP Poll. (#) Tournament seedings in parentheses. All times are in Pacific Time.
