= 2006–07 USC Trojans men's basketball team =

American college basketball season

2006–07 USC Trojans men's basketball

NCAA tournament, Sweet Sixteen
- Conference: Pacific-10 Conference

Ranking
- Coaches: No. 15
- AP: No. 23
- Record: 25–12 (11–7 Pac-10)
- Head coach: Tim Floyd
- Assistant coaches: Gib Arnold; Bob Cantu; Phil L. Johnson
- Home arena: Galen Center

2006–07 Pacific-10 Conference men's basketball standings
	Conf.				Overall
Team	W		L	PCT	W		L	PCT
No. 7 UCLA	15	–	3	.833	30	–	6	.833
No. 13 Washington State	13	–	5	.722	26	–	8	.765
No. 23 USC^{1}	11	–	7	.611	25	–	12	.676
No. 10 Oregon†^{2}	11	–	7	.611	29	–	8	.784
Arizona	11	–	7	.611	20	–	11	.645
Stanford	10	–	8	.556	18	–	13	.581
Washington	8	–	10	.444	19	–	13	.594
California	6	–	12	.333	16	–	17	.485
Oregon State	3	–	15	.167	11	–	21	.344
Arizona State	2	–	16	.111	8	–	22	.267
† Conference tournament winner As of March 18, 2007; Rankings from AP poll^{1} Holds tie-breaker, ^{2} Holds second tie-breaker.

== Class of 2006 ==
College recruiting
Name	Hometown	School	Height	Weight	Commit date
Kyle Austin; PF	Pasadena, CA	Pasadena HS	6 ft 6 in (1.98 m)	195 lb (88 kg)	Jul 7, 2006
Kyle Austin; PF	Recruit ratings: Scout: Rivals:				
Kasey Cunningham; PF	Albuquerque, NM	Cibola HS	6 ft 6 in (1.98 m)	205 lb (93 kg)	Sep 22, 2005
Kasey Cunningham; PF	Recruit ratings: Scout: Rivals:				
Kevin Galloway; SF	Sacramento, CA	Sacramento HS	6 ft 5 in (1.96 m)	190 lb (86 kg)	Aug 21, 2005
Kevin Galloway; SF	Recruit ratings: Scout: Rivals:				
Taj Gibson; PF	Tarzana, CA	Stoneridge Preparatory School	6 ft 8 in (2.03 m)	200 lb (91 kg)	Sep 19, 2005
Taj Gibson; PF	Recruit ratings: Scout: Rivals:				
Daniel Hackett; SG	Downey, CA	St. John Bosco HS	6 ft 5 in (1.96 m)	195 lb (88 kg)	Sep 19, 2005
Daniel Hackett; SG	Recruit ratings: Scout: Rivals:				
Dwight Lewis; SG	Metairie, LA	Archbishop Rummel HS	6 ft 5 in (1.96 m)	190 lb (86 kg)	Nov 3, 2005
Dwight Lewis; SG	Recruit ratings: Scout: Rivals:				
Overall Recruiting Rankings: Scout – 17 Rivals – 21 ESPN –

== Roster ==
2006–07 USC Trojans men's basketball team
Players
Coaches

Pos.	#	Name	Height	Weight	Year	Hometown
F	20	Kyle Austin	6 ft 7 in (2.01 m)	195 lb (88 kg)	Fr	Pasadena, CA
F	42	RouSean Cromwell	6 ft 11 in (2.11 m)	217 lb (98 kg)	So	Memphis, TN
F	43	Kasey Cunningham	6 ft 7 in (2.01 m)	220 lb (100 kg)	Fr	Albuquerque, NM
F	44	Reed Doucette	6 ft 6 in (1.98 m)	212 lb (96 kg)	Sr	Lodi, CA
F	22	Taj Gibson	6 ft 9 in (2.06 m)	210 lb (95 kg)	Fr	Brooklyn, NY
G	30	Terence Green	5 ft 10 in (1.78 m)	176 lb (80 kg)	So	Aliso Viejo, CA
G	13	Daniel Hackett	6 ft 5 in (1.96 m)	205 lb (93 kg)	Fr	Forlimpopoli, Italy
G	15	Dwight Lewis	6 ft 5 in (1.96 m)	200 lb (91 kg)	Fr	Metairie, LA
C	21	Abdoulaye N'diaye	6 ft 11 in (2.11 m)	220 lb (100 kg)	Sr	Dakar, Senegal
G	10	Chris Penrose	6 ft 0 in (1.83 m)	172 lb (78 kg)	Sr	San Diego, CA
G	34	Gabe Pruitt	6 ft 4 in (1.93 m)	170 lb (77 kg)	Jr	Los Angeles, CA
G	3	Lodrick Stewart	6 ft 4 in (1.93 m)	210 lb (95 kg)	Sr	Seattle, CA
G	2	Ryan Wetherell	5 ft 10 in (1.78 m)	165 lb (75 kg)	Fr	Calgary, Alberta
F	23	Keith Wilkinson	6 ft 10 in (2.08 m)	220 lb (100 kg)	So	Mission Viejo, CA
G/F	1	Nick Young	6 ft 6 in (1.98 m)	200 lb (91 kg)	Jr	Los Angeles, CA

Head coach

- Tim Floyd (Louisiana Tech)

Assistant coach(es)

- Gib Arnold
- Bob Cantu
- Phil Johnson (East Central Oklahoma State)

Legend

- (C) Team captain
- (S) Suspended
- (I) Ineligible
- (W) Walk-on
- Injured
- Current redshirt

Roster

== Schedule ==
Date time, TV	Rank^{#}	Opponent^{#}	Result	Record	Site city, state
Regular Season
November 16, 2006*; 7:30 pm, Prime Ticket		South Carolina	L 74–80 ^{OT}	0–1	Galen Center (7,512); Los Angeles, CA
November 18, 2006*; 12:00 pm		Saint Mary's College	W 69–63	1–1	Galen Center (4,127); Los Angeles, CA
November 21, 2006*; 7:30 pm		The Citadel	W 74–58	2–1	Galen Center (3,733); Los Angeles, CA
November 24, 2006*; 7:30 pm, Prime Ticket		Long Beach State	W 79–61	3–1	Galen Center (7,112); Los Angeles, CA
November 28, 2006*; 7:30 pm		Mississippi Valley State	W 63–39	4–1	Galen Center (1,733); Los Angeles, CA
December 2, 2006*; 6:00 pm, Prime Ticket		Loyola Marymount	W 67–50	5–1	Galen Center (2,479); Los Angeles, CA
December 4, 2006*; 6:00 pm, ESPN2		at No. 13 Kansas	L 62–72	5–2	Allen Fieldhouse (16,300); Lawrence, Kansas
December 9, 2006*; 2:00 pm, KCAL/WGN		vs. George Washington; John R. Wooden Classic	W 74–65	6–2	Honda Center (15,811); Anaheim, CA
December 14, 2006*; 7:30 pm		Bethune-Cookman	W 88–36	7–2	Galen Center (2,117); Los Angeles, CA
December 17, 2006*; 2:00 pm		Charleston Southern; Las Vegas Classic	W 70–58	8–2	Galen Center (1,816); Los Angeles, CA
December 19, 2006*; 7:30 pm		Longwood; Las Vegas Classic	W 83–53	9–2	Galen Center (2,381); Los Angeles, CA
December 22, 2006*; 5:00 pm		vs. Kansas State; Las Vegas Classic	L 55–68	9–3	Orleans Arena (1,000); Las Vegas, NV
December 23, 2006*; 5:00 pm		vs. No. 8 Wichita State; Las Vegas Classic 3rd Place Game	W 60–56	10–3	Orleans Arena (3,573); Las Vegas, NV
December 28, 2006; 7:30 pm, FSN West		No. 13 Washington	W 86–79 ^{2OT}	11–3 (1–0)	Galen Center (5,355); Los Angeles, CA
December 30, 2006; 3:00 pm, FSN		Washington State	L 55–58	11–4 (1–1)	Galen Center (5,924); Los Angeles, CA
January 4, 2007; 5:30 pm		at No. 17 Oregon	W 84–82	12–4 (2–1)	McArthur Court (8,389); Eugene, OR
January 6, 2007; 3:00 pm, FSN		at Oregon State	W 91–46	13–4 (3–1)	Gill Coliseum (5,973); Corvallis, OR
January 13, 2007; 11:30 am, FSN		No. 3 UCLA; Rivalry	L 64–65	13–5 (3–2)	Galen Center (9,682); Los Angeles, CA
January 18, 2007; 7:30 pm, FSN West		No. 12 Arizona	W 80–73	14–5 (4–2)	Galen Center (9,922); Los Angeles, CA
January 20, 2007; 5:00 pm, Prime Ticket		Arizona State	W 58–49	15–5 (5–2)	Galen Center (5,824); Los Angeles, CA
January 25, 2007; 8:00 pm, FSN		at Stanford	L 50–65	15–6 (5–3)	Maples Pavilion (7,145); Palo Alto, CA
January 27, 2007; 3:00 pm		at California	W 76–73	16–6 (6–3)	Haas Pavilion (8,901); Berkeley, CA
February 1, 2007; 7:30pm		Oregon State	W 73–56	17–6 (7–3)	Galen Center (6,934); Los Angeles, CA
February 3, 2007; 12:30pm, Prime Ticket		No. 9 Oregon	W 71–68	18–6 (8–3)	Galen Center (8,119); Los Angeles, CA
February 7, 2007; 7:30pm, Prime Ticket	No. 21	at No. 2 UCLA; Rivalry	L 65–70	18–7 (8–4)	Pauley Pavilion (12,810); Los Angeles, CA
February 15, 2007; 8:30pm, Prime Ticket	No. 23	at No. 24 Arizona	W 80–75	19–7 (9–4)	McKale Center (14,623); Tucson, AZ
February 18, 2007; 6:00pm, Prime Ticket	No. 23	at Arizona State	L 58–68	19–8 (9–5)	Wells Fargo Arena (6,758); Tempe, AZ
February 22, 2007; 7:30pm, FSN West		Stanford	W 69–65	20–8 (10–5)	Galen Center (9,560); Los Angeles, CA
February 24, 2007; 5:00pm, Prime Ticket		California	W 84–68	21–8 (11–5)	Galen Center (10,027); Los Angeles, CA
March 1, 2007; 7:00pm, Prime Ticket	No. 24	Washington	L 70–85	21–9 (11–6)	Bank of America Arena (10,000); Seattle, WA
March 3, 2007; 4:00pm	No. 24	No. 13 Washington State	L 86–88 ^{2OT}	21–10 (11–7)	Friel Court (11,618); Pullman, WA
Pac-10 Tournament
March 8, 2007; 6:20 pm, FSN	(3)	vs. (6) Stanford; Quarterfinals	W 83–79 ^{OT}	22–10	Staples Center (NA); Los Angeles, CA
March 9, 2007; 8:50 pm, FSN	(3)	vs. (2) No. 12 Washington State; Semifinals	W 70–61	23–10	Staples Center (18,196); Los Angeles, CA
March 10, 2007; 3:00 pm, CBS	(3)	vs. (4) No. 18 Oregon; Championship	L 57–81	23–11	Staples Center (18,259); Los Angeles, CA
NCAA Tournament
March 16, 2007*; 6:55pm, CBS	(5 E)	vs. (12 E) Arkansas; First Round	W 77–60	24–11	Spokane Arena (11,551); Spokane, WA
March 18, 2007*; 2:15pm, CBS	(5 E)	vs. (4 E) No. 14 Texas; Second Round	W 87–68	25–11	Spokane Arena (11,551); Spokane, WA
March 23, 2007*; 6:57pm, CBS	(5 E)	vs. (1 E) No. 8 North Carolina; Sweet Sixteen	L 64–74	25–12	Continental Airlines Arena (19,557); East Rutherford, NJ
*Non-conference game. ^{#}Rankings from USA Today Coaches Poll. (#) Tournament seedings in parentheses. E=East. All times are in PST.
