= 2006–07 UCLA Bruins men's basketball team =

American college basketball season

2006–07 UCLA Bruins men's basketball

Pac-10 regular season champions Maui Invitational champions

NCAA tournament, Final Four
- Conference: Pacific-10 Conference

Ranking
- Coaches: No. 3
- AP: No. 7
- Record: 30–6 (15–3 Pac-10)
- Head coach: Ben Howland (4th season)
- Assistant coaches: Donny Daniels; Scott Garson; Kerry Keating
- Home arena: Pauley Pavilion

2006–07 Pacific-10 Conference men's basketball standings
	Conf.				Overall
Team	W		L	PCT	W		L	PCT
No. 7 UCLA	15	–	3	.833	30	–	6	.833
No. 13 Washington State	13	–	5	.722	26	–	8	.765
No. 23 USC^{1}	11	–	7	.611	25	–	12	.676
No. 10 Oregon†^{2}	11	–	7	.611	29	–	8	.784
Arizona	11	–	7	.611	20	–	11	.645
Stanford	10	–	8	.556	18	–	13	.581
Washington	8	–	10	.444	19	–	13	.594
California	6	–	12	.333	16	–	17	.485
Oregon State	3	–	15	.167	11	–	21	.344
Arizona State	2	–	16	.111	8	–	22	.267
† Conference tournament winner As of March 18, 2007; Rankings from AP poll^{1} Holds tie-breaker, ^{2} Holds second tie-breaker.

The 2006–07 UCLA Bruins men's basketball team represented the University of California, Los Angeles in the 2006–07 NCAA Division I men's basketball season. The Bruins finished first in the Pacific-10 Conference standings. The team reached the Final Four in the 2007 NCAA Division I men's basketball tournament for the second consecutive year, losing to the eventual champions the Florida Gators, 76–66, the same team they lost to in last year's championship game.

== Recruiting class ==
College recruiting
Name	Hometown	School	Height	Weight	Commit date
Mustafa Abdul-Hamid; PG	St. Louis, Missouri	Country Day HS	6 ft 2 in (1.88 m)	195 lb (88 kg)	
Mustafa Abdul-Hamid; PG	Recruit ratings: Scout: Rivals:				
Nikola Dragovic; SF	Belgrade, Serbia	Second Secondary School of Economics	6 ft 9 in (2.06 m)	216 lb (98 kg)	Jul 7, 2006
Nikola Dragovic; SF	Recruit ratings: Scout: Rivals:				
James Keefe; PF	Rancho Santa Margarita, California	Santa Margarita HS	6 ft 8 in (2.03 m)	235 lb (107 kg)	Nov 18, 2004
James Keefe; PF	Recruit ratings: Scout: Rivals:				
Russell Westbrook; SG	Hawthorne, California	Leuzinger HS	6 ft 3 in (1.91 m)	187 lb (85 kg)	Apr 18, 2004
Russell Westbrook; SG	Recruit ratings: Scout: Rivals:				
Overall recruit ranking: Scout: 21 Rivals: NR
Note: In many cases, Scout, Rivals, 247Sports, On3, and ESPN may conflict in their listings of height and weight.; In these cases, the average was taken. ESPN grades are on a 100-point scale.; Sources: "UCLA Commit List for 2006". Rivals.; "Men's Basketball Recruiting". Scout.; "ESPN – UCLA Bruins Basketball Recruiting 2006". ESPN.; "Scout.com Team Recruiting Rankings". Scout.; "2006 Team Ranking". Rivals.

== Roster ==
2006–07 UCLA Bruins men's basketball team
Players
Coaches

Pos.	#	Name	Height	Weight	Year	Hometown
F/C	12	Alfred Aboya	6 ft 8 in (2.03 m)	245 lb (111 kg)	So	Yaoundé (Cameroon)
G	10	Mustafa Abdul-Hamid	6 ft 2 in (1.88 m)	195 lb (88 kg)	Fr	St. Louis, Missouri
G	4	Arron Afflalo (C)	6 ft 5 in (1.96 m)	215 lb (98 kg)	Jr	Compton, California
G	2	Darren Collison (C)	6 ft 1 in (1.85 m)	160 lb (73 kg)	So	Rancho Cucamonga, California
F	41	Nikola Dragović	6 ft 8 in (2.03 m)	216 lb (98 kg)	Fr	Belgrade (Serbia)
G	24	Joey Ellis (W)	6 ft 2 in (1.88 m)	185 lb (84 kg)	So	Hidden Hills, California
F/C	13	James Keefe	6 ft 8 in (2.03 m)	235 lb (107 kg)	Fr	Rancho Santa Margarita, California
G	55	Matt Lee (W)	6 ft 0 in (1.83 m)	170 lb (77 kg)	Jr	San Francisco, California
F/C	14	Lorenzo Mata	6 ft 9 in (2.06 m)	240 lb (109 kg)	Jr	Huntington Park, California
F	23	Luc Richard Mbah a Moute	6 ft 8 in (2.03 m)	230 lb (104 kg)	So	Yaoundé (Cameroon)
F	22	David McGrath (W)	6 ft 4 in (1.93 m)	205 lb (93 kg)	So	Oxnard, California
G	21	Ben Gonzales III (W)	6 ft 0 in (1.83 m)	185 lb (84 kg)	Fr	Van Nuys, California
G	5	DeAndre Robinson (W)	6 ft 5 in (1.96 m)	210 lb (95 kg)	So	Riverside, California
G	32	Rusten O'Neil (W)	6 ft 0 in (1.83 m)	180 lb (82 kg)	Fr	Van Nuys, California
G/F	3	Josh Shipp (C)	6 ft 5 in (1.96 m)	220 lb (100 kg)	So	Los Angeles
G/F	20	Michael Roll	6 ft 5 in (1.96 m)	200 lb (91 kg)	So	Aliso Viejo, California
G	0	Russell Westbrook	6 ft 3 in (1.91 m)	187 lb (85 kg)	Fr	Hawthorne, California
F/C	11	Ryan Wright	6 ft 9 in (2.06 m)	238 lb (108 kg)	So	Mississauga, Ontario

Head coach

Ben Howland (Weber State)

Assistant coach(es)

- Donny Daniels (Cal State Fullerton)
- Scott Garson (UC Santa Barbara)
- Kerry Keating (Seton Hall)

Legend

- (C) Team captain
- (S) Suspended
- (I) Ineligible
- (W) Walk-on
- Injured
- Current redshirt

Roster

== Schedule ==
Date time, TV	Rank^{#}	Opponent^{#}	Result	Record	Site city, state
Exhibition
November 2, 2006*; 7:30 p.m.	No. 5	Cal Poly Pomona	W 73–43	0–0	Pauley Pavilion; Los Angeles, California
November 9, 2006*; 7:30 p.m.	No. 5	Humboldt State	W 87–61	0–0	Pauley Pavilion; Los Angeles, California
Regular Season
November 15, 2006*; FSN PT	No. 6	BYU	W 82–69	1–0	Pauley Pavilion (9,297); Los Angeles, California
November 20, 2006*; 7:30 p.m., ESPN2	No. 5	vs. Chaminade; Maui Invitational	W 88-63	2–0	Lahaina Civic Center (2,400); Lahaina, Hawaii
November 21, 2006*; 8:30 p.m., ESPN	No. 5	vs. No. 20 Kentucky; Maui Invitational	W 73-68	3–0	Lahaina Civic Center (2,400); Lahaina, Hawaii
November 22, 2006*; 10:00 p.m., ESPN	No. 5	vs. Georgia Tech; Maui Invitational	W 88–73	4–0	Lahaina Civic Center (2,400); Lahaina, Hawaii
November 28, 2006*; 7:30 p.m.	No. 2	Long Beach State	W 88–58	5–0	Pauley Pavilion (8,428); Los Angeles, California
December 3, 2006*; 2:30 p.m., FSN PT	No. 2	UC Riverside	W 61–38	6–0	Pauley Pavilion (8,397); Los Angeles, California
December 5, 2006*; 7:30 p.m., FSN PT	No. 1	Cal State Fullerton	W 78–54	7–0	Pauley Pavilion (7,945); Los Angeles, California
December 9, 2006*; 11:30 p.m., CBS	No. 1	vs. No. 6 Texas A&M; John R. Wooden Classic	W 65–62	8–0	Honda Center (15,811); Anaheim, California
December 16, 2006*; 5:00 p.m.	No. 1	Oakland	W 74–53	9–0	Pauley Pavilion (8,612); Los Angeles, California
December 19, 2006*; 7:30 p.m., FSN PT	No. 1	Sam Houston State	W 75–61	10–0	Pauley Pavilion (7,458); Los Angeles, California
December 23, 2006*; 11:00 a.m., CBS	No. 1	Michigan	W 92–55	11–0	Pauley Pavilion (11,876); Los Angeles, California
December 28, 2006; 7:30 p.m., FSN	No. 1	Washington State	W 55–52	12–0 (1–0)	Pauley Pavilion (11,102); Los Angeles, California
December 31, 2006; 2:00 p.m., FSN	No. 1	No. 13 Washington	W 96–74	13–0 (2–0)	Pauley Pavilion (12,042); Los Angeles, California
January 4, 2007; 7:00 p.m., FSN PT	No. 1	at Oregon State	W 71–56	14–0 (3–0)	Gill Coliseum (6,834); Corvallis, Oregon
January 6, 2007; 11:00 a.m., FSN	No. 1	at No. 17 Oregon	L 66–68	14–1 (3–1)	McArthur Court (9,087); Eugene, Oregon
January 13, 2007; 11:30 a.m., FSN	No. 3	at USC	W 65–64	15–1 (4–1)	Galen Center (9,682); Los Angeles, California
January 18, 2007; 7:30 p.m., FSN PT	No. 2	Arizona State	W 60–50	16–1 (5–1)	Pauley Pavilion (10,188); Los Angeles, California
January 20, 2007; 1:00 p.m., FSN	No. 2	No. 12 Arizona	W 73–69	17–1 (6–1)	Pauley Pavilion (12,249); Los Angeles, California
January 25, 2007; 6:00 p.m., FSN	No. 2	at California	W 62–46	18–1 (7–1)	Haas Pavilion (11,877); Berkeley, California
January 28, 2007; 5:00 p.m., FSN	No. 2	at Stanford	L 68–75	18–2 (7–2)	Maples Pavilion (7,334); Stanford, California
February 1, 2007; 7:30 p.m., FSN	No. 5	No. 9 Oregon	W 69–57	19–2 (8–2)	Pauley Pavilion (12,113); Los Angeles, California
February 2, 2007; 2:30 p.m., FSN PT	No. 5	Oregon State	W 82–35	20–2 (9–2)	Pauley Pavilion (11,095); Los Angeles, California
February 7, 2007; FSN PT	No. 2	No. 21 USC	W 70–65	21–2 (10–2)	Pauley Pavilion (12,810); Los Angeles, California
February 10, 2007*; 10:00 a.m., CBS	No. 2	at West Virginia	L 65–70	21–3	WVU Coliseum (14,160); Morgantown, West Virginia
February 15, 2007; 5:30 p.m., FSN	No. 7	at Arizona State	W 67–61	22–3 (11–2)	Wells Fargo, Arena (8,071); Tempe, Arizona
February 17, 2007; 10:00 a.m., CBS	No. 7	at No. 24 Arizona	W 81–66	23–3 (12–2)	McKale Center (14,611); Tucson, Arizona
February 22, 2007; 7:30 p.m., FSN PT	No. 4	California	W 85–75	24–3 (13–2)	Pauley Pavilion (11,230); Los Angeles, California
February 24, 2007; 3:00 p.m., FSN	No. 4	Stanford	W 75–61	25–3 (14–2)	Pauley Pavilion (12,001); Los Angeles, California
March 1, 2007; 7:30 p.m., FSN	No. 2	at No. 13 Washington State	W 53–45	26–3 (15–2)	Beasley Coliseum (11,618); Pullman, Washington
March 3, 2007; 11:00 a.m., CBS	No. 2	at Washington	L 51–61	26–4 (15–3)	Alaska Airlines Arena (10,000); Seattle, Washington
Pac-10 Tournament
March 8, 2007; 2:50 p.m., FSN	No. 4 (1)	vs. (8) California; Quarterfinals	L 69–76 ^{OT}	26–5	Staples Center (16,318); Los Angeles, California
NCAA tournament
March 15, 2007*; 4:20 p.m., CBS	No. 7 (2 W)	vs. (15 W) Weber State; First Round	W 70–42	27–5	ARCO Arena (16,338); Sacramento, California
March 17, 2007*; 5:10 p.m., CBS	No. 7 (2 W)	vs. (7 W) Indiana; Second Round	W 54–49	28–5	ARCO Arena (16,407); Sacramento, California
March 22, 2007*; 6:40 p.m., CBS	No. 7 (2 W)	vs. No. (3 W) 10 Pittsburgh; Sweet Sixteen	W 64–55	29–5	HP Pavilion (18,049); San Jose, California
March 24, 2007*; 4:05 p.m., CBS	No. 7 (2 W)	vs. No. 2 (1 W) Kansas; Elite Eight	W 68–55	30–5	HP Pavilion (18,102); San Jose, California
March 31, 2007*; 5:47 p.m., CBS	No. 7 (2 W)	vs. No. 3 (1 MW) Florida; Final Four	L 66–76	30–6	Georgia Dome (53,510); Atlanta, Georgia
*Non-conference game. ^{#}Rankings from AP Poll. (#) Tournament seedings in parentheses. All times are in Pacific Time.

== See also ==
- 2007 Pacific-10 Conference men's basketball tournament
- 2007 NCAA Division I men's basketball tournament
- 2006–07 NCAA Division I men's basketball season
