= 2006–07 Washington Huskies men's basketball team =

American college basketball season

2006–07 Washington Huskies men's basketball
- Conference: Pacific-10 Conference
- Record: 19–13 (8–10 Pac-10)
- Head coach: Lorenzo Romar (5th season)
- Assistant coaches: Cameron Dollar; Paul Fortier; Jim Shaw
- Home arena: Hec Edmundson Pavilion

2006–07 Pacific-10 Conference men's basketball standings
	Conf.				Overall
Team	W		L	PCT	W		L	PCT
No. 7 UCLA	15	–	3	.833	30	–	6	.833
No. 13 Washington State	13	–	5	.722	26	–	8	.765
No. 23 USC^{1}	11	–	7	.611	25	–	12	.676
No. 10 Oregon†^{2}	11	–	7	.611	29	–	8	.784
Arizona	11	–	7	.611	20	–	11	.645
Stanford	10	–	8	.556	18	–	13	.581
Washington	8	–	10	.444	19	–	13	.594
California	6	–	12	.333	16	–	17	.485
Oregon State	3	–	15	.167	11	–	21	.344
Arizona State	2	–	16	.111	8	–	22	.267
† Conference tournament winner As of March 18, 2007; Rankings from AP poll^{1} Holds tie-breaker, ^{2} Holds second tie-breaker.

The 2006–07 Washington Huskies men's basketball team represented the University of Washington for the 2006–07 NCAA Division I men's basketball season. Led by fifth-year head coach Lorenzo Romar, the Huskies were members of the Pacific-10 Conference and played their home games on campus at Hec Edmundson Pavilion in Seattle, Washington.

The Huskies were 18–12 overall in the regular season and 8–10 in conference play, seventh in the standings. Washington had only one road win in league play (over last place Arizona State), and ended the regular season with home wins over USC and second-ranked UCLA, the regular season champion.

At the conference tournament in Los Angeles, Washington defeated tenth seed Arizona State in the first round, but lost to rival Washington State by ten points in a quarterfinal; it was the fifth straight loss to the Cougars.

== Postseason results ==
Date time, TV	Opponent	Result	Record	Site (attendance) city, state
Pacific-10 Tournament
Wed, March 7; 8:30 pm, FSN	vs. (10) Arizona State; First round	W 59–51	19–12	Staples Center (15,119); Los Angeles, California
Thu, March 8; 8:30 pm, FSN	vs. No. 11 (2) Washington State; Quarterfinal	L 64–74	19–13	Staples Center (16,585); Los Angeles, California
*Non-conference game. ^{#}Rankings from AP poll. (#) Tournament seedings in parentheses. All times are in Pacific time.
