= 2006–07 Stanford Cardinal men's basketball team =

American college basketball season

2006–2007 Stanford Cardinal men's basketball

NCAA tournament, first round
- Conference: Pac-10 Conference
- Record: 18-13 (10-8 Pac-10)
- Head coach: Trent Johnson (3rd season)
- Assistant coaches: Doug Oliver; Donny Guerinoni; Nick Robinson
- Home arena: Maples Pavilion

2006–07 Pacific-10 Conference men's basketball standings
	Conf.				Overall
Team	W		L	PCT	W		L	PCT
No. 7 UCLA	15	–	3	.833	30	–	6	.833
No. 13 Washington State	13	–	5	.722	26	–	8	.765
No. 23 USC^{1}	11	–	7	.611	25	–	12	.676
No. 10 Oregon†^{2}	11	–	7	.611	29	–	8	.784
Arizona	11	–	7	.611	20	–	11	.645
Stanford	10	–	8	.556	18	–	13	.581
Washington	8	–	10	.444	19	–	13	.594
California	6	–	12	.333	16	–	17	.485
Oregon State	3	–	15	.167	11	–	21	.344
Arizona State	2	–	16	.111	8	–	22	.267
† Conference tournament winner As of March 18, 2007; Rankings from AP poll^{1} Holds tie-breaker, ^{2} Holds second tie-breaker.

The 2006–07 Stanford Cardinal men's basketball team represented Stanford University during the 2006–07 NCAA Division I men's basketball season. The Cardinal were led by third year head coach Trent Johnson, and played their home games at Maples Pavilion as a member of the Pacific-10 Conference.

== Previous season ==
The Cardinal finished the 2005–06 season 16–14, 11–7 in Pac-10 play to finish tied for fourth place, losing the tiebreaker against Arizona (0-2 versus Arizona). They lost in the quarterfinals of the Pac-10 tournament to the fourth seed Arizona 73–68. Stanford accepted an invitation to the 2006 NIT winning in the opening round game against Virginia but would lose to Missouri State in the next round.

== Offseason ==
=== Departures ===
Name	Pos.	Height	Weight	Year	Hometown	Reason for departure
Dan Grunfeld	G	6'6"	220	Senior	River Hills, WI	Graduated
Jason Haas	G	6'2"	190	Senior	Spring Hills, PA	Graduated
Matt Haryasz	F	6'11"	230	Senior	Page, AZ	Graduated
Chris Hernandez	G	6'2"	190	Senior	Fresno, CA	Graduated

=== Incoming ===
College recruiting information
Name	Hometown	School	Height	Weight	Commit date
Landry Fields; G	Los Alamitos, CA	Los Alamitos	6 ft 3 in (1.91 m)	170 lb (77 kg)	Feb 10, 2006
Landry Fields; G	Recruit ratings: Rivals: 247Sports:				
Da'veed Dildy; G	Chicago, IL	King College Prep	6 ft 5 in (1.96 m)	185 lb (84 kg)	Feb 9, 2006
Da'veed Dildy; G	Recruit ratings: Rivals: 247Sports:				
Will Paul; F	Corpus Christi, TX	Calallen	6 ft 9 in (2.06 m)	216 lb (98 kg)	Jul 7, 2005
Will Paul; F	Recruit ratings: Rivals: 247Sports:				
Brook Lopez; F	North Hollywood, CA	San Joaquin Memorial	6 ft 11 in (2.11 m)	230 lb (100 kg)	Feb 8, 2005
Brook Lopez; F	Recruit ratings: Rivals: 247Sports:				
Robin Lopez; C	North Hollywood, CA	San Joaquin Memorial	6 ft 11 in (2.11 m)	225 lb (102 kg)	Feb 8, 2005
Robin Lopez; C	Recruit ratings: Rivals: 247Sports:				
Overall recruit ranking: Scout: 15 Rivals: NA ESPN: NA
Note: In many cases, Scout, Rivals, 247Sports, On3, and ESPN may conflict in their listings of height and weight.; In these cases, the average was taken. ESPN grades are on a 100-point scale.; Sources: "Stanford Commit List for 2006". Rivals.; "Men's Basketball Recruiting". Scout.; "ESPN – Stanford Cardinal Basketball Recruiting 2006". ESPN.; "Scout.com Team Recruiting Rankings". Scout.; "2006 Team Ranking". Rivals.

=== Transfer In ===
Name	Pos.	Height	Weight	Year	Hometown	Year Before
Drew Shiller	G	6'0"	185	Sophomore	Burlingame, CA	Transferred from San Francisco, will redshirt 2006-07 season.
Chris Bobel	G	6'2"	195	Senior	Palo Alto, CA	Student recruiting coordinator

== Roster ==
2006–07 Stanford Cardinal men's basketball team
Players
Coaches

Pos.	#	Name	Height	Weight	Year	Previous school	Hometown
G	1	Mitch Johnson	6 ft 1 in (1.85 m)	185 lb (84 kg)	So	O'Dea High School	Seattle, WA
G	2	Landry Fields	6 ft 5 in (1.96 m)	185 lb (84 kg)	Fr	Los Alamitos High School	Los Alamitos, CA
G	3	Carlton Weatherby	6 ft 1 in (1.85 m)	180 lb (82 kg)	RS Sr	Curtis Senior High School	Tacoma, WA
G	4	Anthony Goods	6 ft 3 in (1.91 m)	195 lb (88 kg)	So	Centennial High School	Corona, CA
F	11	Brook Lopez	7 ft 0 in (2.13 m)	240 lb (109 kg)	Fr	San Joaquin Memorial	Fresno, CA
G	13	Drew Shiller (redshirt)	6 ft 0 in (1.83 m)	185 lb (84 kg)	So	Burlingame High School; San Francisco	Burlingame, CA
F	15	Lawrence Hill	6 ft 8 in (2.03 m)	205 lb (93 kg)	So	Deer Valley High School	Glendale, AZ
G	22	Kenny Brown	6 ft 1 in (1.85 m)	190 lb (86 kg)	RS So	Carroll Senior High School	Southlake, TX
G	24	Chris Bobel (W)	6 ft 2 in (1.88 m)	195 lb (88 kg)	Sr	Palo Alto High School	Palo Alto, CA
F	31	Taj Finger	6 ft 8 in (2.03 m)	190 lb (86 kg)	Jr	Fox Lane High School	Mt. Kisco, NY
G	32	Da'veed Dildy	6 ft 5 in (1.96 m)	185 lb (84 kg)	Fr	King College Prep	Chicago, IL
F	34	Will Paul	6 ft 9 in (2.06 m)	220 lb (100 kg)	Fr	Calallen High School	Corpus Christi, TX
C	42	Robin Lopez	7 ft 0 in (2.13 m)	245 lb (111 kg)	Fr	San Joaquin Memorial	Fresno, CA
F	44	Fred Washington	6 ft 5 in (1.96 m)	205 lb (93 kg)	Sr	Bishop Montgomery High School	Los Angeles, CA
C	55	Peter Prowitt	6 ft 10 in (2.08 m)	250 lb (113 kg)	Jr	The Potomac School	Arlington, VA

Head coach

- Trent Johnson (Boise State)

Assistant coach(es)

- Doug Oliver (San José State)
- Donny Guerinoni (Nevada)
- Nick Robinson (Stanford)

Legend

- (C) Team captain
- (S) Suspended
- (I) Ineligible
- (W) Walk-on
- Injured
- Current redshirt

Roster
Last update: March 23, 2020

== Schedule and results ==
Date time, TV	Rank^{#}	Opponent^{#}	Result	Record	Site (attendance) city, state
Exhibition
November 7, 2006*		British Columbia	W 79-59	–	Maples Pavilion (N/A); Stanford, CA
Regular season
November 11, 2006*; 1:00 PM		Siena	W 92-72	1-0	Maples Pavilion (6,631); Stanford, CA
November 14, 2006*; 8:00 PM		San Jose State; CBE Hall of Fame Classic	W 73-52	2-0	Maples Pavilion (6,787); Stanford, CA
November 15, 2006*; 7:00 PM		Air Force; CBE Hall of Fame Classic	L 45-79	2-1	Maples Pavilion (6,817); Stanford, CA
November 17, 2006*; 7:00 PM		Northwestern	W 58-53	3-1	Maples Pavilion (6,732); Stanford, CA
November 25, 2006*; 1:00 PM		Denver	W 82-39	4-1	Maples Pavilion (6,894); Stanford, CA
November 28, 2006*; 7:30 PM		UC Davis	W 84-72	5-1	Maples Pavilion (7,065); Stanford, CA
December 3, 2006*; 3:30 PM		vs. Texas Tech; Pete Newell Challenge	W 70-59	6-1	SAP Center (7,833); San Jose, CA
December 16, 2006*; 7:00 PM		Santa Clara	L 46-62	6-2	Maples Pavilion (6,953); Stanford, CA
December 19, 2006*; 7:00 PM		at Fresno State	W 69-67	7-2	Save Mart Center (15,423); Fresno, CA
December 28, 2006; 7:00 PM		at Arizona State	W 71-60	8-2 (1-0)	Wells Fargo Arena (7,656); Tempe, AZ
December 30, 2006; 12:00 PM		at No. 7 Arizona	L 75-89	8-3 (1-1)	McKale Center (14,571); Tucson, AZ
January 3, 2007; 7:00 PM		California	L 63-67	8-4 (1-2)	Maples Pavilion (7,332); Stanford, CA
January 7, 2007*; 5:00 PM		at Virginia	W 76-75	9-4	John Paul Jones Arena (13,846); Charlottesville, VA
January 11, 2007; 7:30 PM		Washington	W 78-77	10-4 (2-2)	Maples Pavilion (7,010); Stanford, CA
January 13, 2007; 4:00 PM		No. 23 Washington State	W 71-68 ^{OT}	11-4 (3-2)	Maples Pavilion (7,238); Stanford, CA
January 18, 2007; 5:30 PM		at No. 9 Oregon	W 67-56	11-5 (3-3)	McArthur Court (8,873); Eugene, OR
January 20, 2007; 5:00 PM		at Oregon State	W 67-56	12-5 (4-3)	Gill Coliseum (7,145); Corvallis, OR
January 25, 2007; 8:00 PM		No. 25 USC	W 65-50	13-5 (5-3)	Maples Pavilion (7,145); Stanford, CA
January 28, 2007; 5:00 PM		No. 3 UCLA	W 75-68	14-5 (6-3)	Maples Pavilion (7,334); Stanford, CA
January 31, 2007*; 8:00 PM	No. 23	Gonzaga	L 86-90 ^{2OT}	14-6	Maples Pavilion (7,178); Stanford, CA
February 3, 2007; 6:30 PM	No. 23	at California	W 90-71	15-6 (7-3)	Haas Pavilion (10,684); Berkeley, CA
February 8, 2007; 7:00 PM	No. 25	at No. 14 Washington State	L 45-68	15-7 (7-4)	Beasley Coliseum (7,456); Pullman, WA
February 11, 2007; 4:00 PM	No. 25	at Washington	L 52-64	15-8 (7-5)	Hec Edmundson Pavilion (10,000); Seattle, WA
February 15, 2007; 7:30 PM		Oregon State	W 70-55	16-8 (8-5)	Maples Pavilion (7,005); Stanford, CA
February 17, 2007; 5:00 PM		No. 15 Oregon	W 88-69	17-8 (9-5)	Maples Pavilion (7,332); Stanford, CA
February 22, 2007; 7:30 PM		at USC	L 65-69	17-9 (9-6)	Los Angeles Memorial Sports Arena (9,560); Los Angeles, CA
February 24, 2007; 3:00 PM		at No. 4 UCLA	L 61-75	17-10 (9-7)	Pauley Pavilion (12,001); Los Angeles, CA
March 1, 2007; 7:00 PM		Arizona State	W 63-53	18-10 (10-7)	Maples Pavilion (7,502); Stanford, CA
March 3, 2007; 12:30 PM		Arizona	L 80-85 ^{OT}	18-11 (10-8)	Maples Pavilion (7,204); Stanford, CA
Pac-10 tournament
March 8, 2007; 6:20 PM	(6)	vs. (3) USC; Quarterfinals	L 79-83 ^{OT}	18-12	Staples Center (16,585); Los Angeles, CA
NCAA tournament
March 15, 2007*; 12:30 PM	(11 S)	(6 S) No. 16 Louisville; First Round	L 58-78	18-13	Rupp Arena (20,816); Lexington, KY
*Non-conference game. ^{#}Rankings from AP Poll. (#) Tournament seedings in parentheses. All times are in Pacific Time.
