= 2006–07 Arizona Wildcats men's basketball team =

American college basketball season

2006–07 Arizona Wildcats men's basketball

NCAA Tournament, Round of 64
- Conference: Pacific-10 Conference
- Record: 20–11 (11–7 Pac-10)
- Head coach: Lute Olson (24th season)
- Assistant coach: Jim Rosborough
- Home arena: McKale Center

2006–07 Pacific-10 Conference men's basketball standings
| | Conf. | | | | Overall |
| Team | W | | L | PCT | W | | L | PCT |
|---|---|---|---|---|---|---|---|---|
| No. 7 UCLA | 15 | – | 3 | .833 | 30 | – | 6 | .833 |
| No. 13 Washington State | 13 | – | 5 | .722 | 26 | – | 8 | .765 |
| No. 23 USC^{1} | 11 | – | 7 | .611 | 25 | – | 12 | .676 |
| No. 10 Oregon†^{2} | 11 | – | 7 | .611 | 29 | – | 8 | .784 |
| Arizona | 11 | – | 7 | .611 | 20 | – | 11 | .645 |
| Stanford | 10 | – | 8 | .556 | 18 | – | 13 | .581 |
| Washington | 8 | – | 10 | .444 | 19 | – | 13 | .594 |
| California | 6 | – | 12 | .333 | 16 | – | 17 | .485 |
| Oregon State | 3 | – | 15 | .167 | 11 | – | 21 | .344 |
| Arizona State | 2 | – | 16 | .111 | 8 | – | 22 | .267 |
† Conference tournament winner As of March 18, 2007; Rankings from AP poll^{1} Holds tie-breaker, ^{2} Holds second tie-breaker.

The 2006–07 Arizona Wildcats men's basketball team represented the University of Arizona during the 2006–07 NCAA Division I men's basketball season. The Wildcats, led by head coach Lute Olson, played their home games at the McKale Center and are members of the Pacific-10 Conference.

== Recruiting class ==
College recruiting information
| Name | Hometown | School | Height | Weight | Commit date |
|---|---|---|---|---|---|
| Chase Budinger; SF | Encinitas, California | La Costa Canyon High School | 6 ft 8 in (2.03 m) | 195 lb (88 kg) | Aug 17, 2005 |
| Chase Budinger; SF | Recruit ratings: Scout: Rivals: | | | | |
| Jordan Hill; PF | Patterson, North Carolina | The Patterson School | 6 ft 10 in (2.08 m) | 200 lb (91 kg) | May 15, 2005 |
| Jordan Hill; PF | Recruit ratings: Scout: Rivals: | | | | |
| Nic Wise; PG | Kingwood, Texas | Kingwood High School | 5 ft 10 in (1.78 m) | 180 lb (82 kg) | Feb 5, 2003 |
| Nic Wise; PG | Recruit ratings: Scout: Rivals: | | | | |
Overall recruit ranking: Scout: 19 Rivals: 25
Note: In many cases, Scout, Rivals, 247Sports, On3, and ESPN may conflict in their listings of height and weight.; In these cases, the average was taken. ESPN grades are on a 100-point scale.; Sources: "ESPN". ESPN.; "2006 Team Ranking". Rivals.

== Roster ==
2006–07 Arizona Wildcats men's basketball team
Players
Coaches

| Pos. | # | Name | Height | Weight | Year | Hometown |
|---|---|---|---|---|---|---|
| F | 3 | Marcus Williams | 6 ft 7 in (2.01 m) | 205 lb (93 kg) | So | Seattle, Washington |
| G | 5 | Jawann McClellan | 6 ft 4 in (1.93 m) | 210 lb (95 kg) | Jr | Houston, Texas |
| G | 11 | David Bagga (W) | 6 ft 5 in (1.96 m) | 185 lb (84 kg) | So | Santa Ana, California |
| G | 12 | Daniel Dillon | 6 ft 3 in (1.91 m) | 205 lb (93 kg) | Jr | Melbourne, Victoria |
| G | 13 | Nic Wise | 5 ft 9 in (1.75 m) | 190 lb (86 kg) | Fr | Houston, Texas |
| F | 14 | Mohamed Tangara | 6 ft 9 in (2.06 m) | 240 lb (109 kg) | RS So | Bamako, Mali |
| G | 15 | Mustafa Shakur | 6 ft 3 in (1.91 m) | 190 lb (86 kg) | Sr | Philadelphia, Pennsylvania |
| F | 24 | Fendi Onobun | 6 ft 6 in (1.98 m) | 240 lb (109 kg) | So | Houston, Texas |
| G | 30 | J. P. Prince | 6 ft 6 in (1.98 m) | 185 lb (84 kg) | So | Memphis, Tennessee |
| F | 34 | Chase Budinger | 6 ft 7 in (2.01 m) | 205 lb (93 kg) | Fr | Encinitas, California |
| F | 43 | Jordan Hill | 6 ft 9 in (2.06 m) | 210 lb (95 kg) | Fr | Atlanta, Georgia |
| F | 44 | Bret Brielmaier (W) | 6 ft 6 in (1.98 m) | 235 lb (107 kg) | Jr | Mankato, Minnesota |
| F | 54 | Kirk Walters (redshirt) | 6 ft 11 in (2.11 m) | 255 lb (116 kg) | Sr | Grand Rapids, Michigan |
| F | 55 | Ivan Radenović | 6 ft 10 in (2.08 m) | 240 lb (109 kg) | Sr | Belgrade, Serbia |

Head coach

- Lute Olson (Augsburg)

Assistant coach(es)

- Jim Rosborough (Iowa)
- Josh Pastner (Arizona)
- Miles Simon (Arizona)

Legend

- (C) Team captain
- (S) Suspended
- (I) Ineligible
- (W) Walk-on
- Injured
- Current redshirt

Roster

=== Depth chart ===
| Pos. | Starting 5 | Bench 1 | Bench 2 |
|---|---|---|---|
| C | Ivan Radenovic | Kirk Walters |
| PF | Jordan Hill | Mohamed Tangara | Bret Brielmaier |
| SF | Chase Budinger | Fendi Onobun | David Bagga |
| SG | Marcus Williams | Jawann McClellan | J.P. Prince |
| PG | Mustafa Shakur | Daniel Dillon | Nic Wise |

== Schedule ==
| Date time, TV | Rank^{#} | Opponent^{#} | Result | Record | Site (attendance) city, state |
Regular season
| November 12, 2006*; 5:00 pm, FSAZ | No. 10 | at Virginia | L 90–93 | 0–1 | John Paul Jones Arena (15,219); Charlottesville, VA |
| November 15, 2006*; 7:30 pm, FSAZ | No. 16 | Northern Arizona | W 101–79 | 1–1 | McKale Center (13,511); Tucson, AZ |
| November 19, 2006*; 2:00 pm, FSAZ | No. 16 | New Mexico State | W 102–87 | 2–1 | McKale Center (13,650); Tucson, AZ |
| November 22, 2006*; 7:30 pm, FSAZ | No. 15 | Samford | W 86–57 | 3–1 | McKale Center (13,220); Tucson, AZ |
| November 28, 2006*; 8:30 pm, FSAZ | No. 16 | UNLV | W 89–75 | 4–1 | McKale Center (13,180); Tucson, AZ |
| December 2, 2006*; 3:15 pm, ESPN | No. 16 | Illinois; Basketball Hall of Fame Challenge | W 84–72 | 5–1 | U.S. Airways Center (15,507); Phoenix, AZ |
| December 5, 2006*; 7:30 pm, ESPN | No. 15 | vs. Louisville; Jimmy V Classic | W 72–65 | 6–1 | Madison Square Garden (10,611); New York, NY |
| December 9, 2006*; 7:30 pm | No. 15 | at San Diego State | W 69–48 | 7–1 | Cox Arena at Aztec Bowl (12,414); San Diego, CA |
| December 17, 2006*; 8:00 pm, FSAZ | No. 11 | Houston | W 87–62 | 8–1 | McKale Center (14,545); Tucson, AZ |
| December 20, 2006*; 6:30 pm, FSN | No. 9 | No. 18 Memphis; Fiesta Bowl Classic | W 79–71 | 9–1 | McKale Center (14,568); Tucson, AZ |
| December 28, 2006; 6:30 pm, FSAZ | No. 7 | California | W 94–85 | 10–1 (1–0) | McKale Center (14,562); Tucson, AZ |
| December 30, 2006; 12:00 pm, FSN | No. 7 | Stanford | W 89–75 | 11–1 (2–0) | McKale Center (14,571); Tucson, AZ |
| January 4, 2007; 7:00 pm, FSN | No. 7 | at No. 20 Washington | W 96–87 | 12–1 (3–0) | Bank of American Arena (10,000); Seattle, WA |
| January 6, 2007; 8:00 pm, FSAZ | No. 7 | at Washington State | L 73–77 ^{OT} | 12–2 (3–1) | Beasley Coliseum (7,181); Pullman, WA |
| January 11, 2007; 6:30 pm, FSAZ | No. 8 | Oregon State | W 83–72 | 13–2 (4–1) | McKale Center (14,428); Tucson, AZ |
| January 14, 2007; 6:00 pm, FSN | No. 8 | No. 17 Oregon | L 77–79 | 13–3 (4–2) | McKale Center (14,562); Tucson, AZ |
| January 18, 2007; 8:30 pm, FSAZ | No. 12 | at USC | L 73–80 | 13–4 (4–3) | Galen Center (9,725); Los Angeles, CA |
| January 20, 2007; 2:00 pm, FSN | No. 12 | at No. 2 UCLA | L 69–73 | 13–5 (4–4) | Pauley Pavilion (12,249); Los Angeles, CA |
| January 24, 2007; 7:30 pm, FSAZ | No. 19 | No. 6 Arizona State | W 71–47 | 14–5 (5–4) | McKale Center (14,572); Tucson, AZ |
| January 27, 2007*; 11:00 am, CBS | No. 19 | No. 4 North Carolina | L 64–92 | 14–6 | McKale Center (14,596); Tucson, AZ |
| February 1, 2007; 6:30 pm, FSAZ | No. 22 | No. 17 Washington State | L 66–72 | 14–7 (5–5) | McKale Center (13,922); Tucson, AZ |
| February 3, 2007; 11:30 am, FSN | No. 22 | Washington | W 84–55 | 15–7 (6–5) | McKale Center (14,118); Tucson, AZ |
| February 8, 2007; 8:30 pm, FSAZ | | at Oregon State | W 72–66 | 16–7 (7–5) | Gill Coliseum (5,928); Corvallis, OR |
| February 10, 2007; 1:30 pm, ABC | | at No. 15 Oregon | W 77–74 | 17–7 (8–5) | McArthur Court (9,087); Eugene, OR |
| February 15, 2007; 8:30 pm, FSAZ | No. 24 | No. 23 USC | L 75–80 | 17–8 (8–6) | McKale Center (14,623); Tucson, AZ |
| February 17, 2007; 11:00 am, CBS | No. 24 | No. 7 UCLA | L 66–81 | 17–9 (8–7) | McKale Center (14,611); Tucson, AZ |
| February 25, 2007; 6:00 pm, FSN | | at Arizona State | W 61–58 | 18–9 (9–7) | Wells Fargo Arena (13,244); Tempe, AZ |
| March 1, 2007; 8:30 pm, FSAZ | | at California | W 70–65 | 19–9 (10–7) | Haas Pavilion (9,168); Berkeley, CA |
| March 3, 2007; 1:30 pm, ABC | | at Stanford | W 85–80 ^{OT} | 20–9 (11–7) | Maples Pavilion (7,204); Stanford, CA |
Pac-10 tournament
| March 8, 2007; 1:20 pm, FSN | | vs. No. 18 Oregon; Quarterfinal | L 50–69 | 20–10 | Staples Center (16,318); Los Angeles, CA |
NCAA tournament
| March 16, 2007*; 8:20 pm, CBS | No. (8) | vs. No. (9) Purdue; First Round | L 63–72 | 20–11 | New Orleans Arena (13,585); New Orleans, LA |
*Non-conference game. ^{#}Rankings from AP Poll. (#) Tournament seedings in parentheses. All times are in Mountain Time.

== Awards ==
Chase Budinger

- Pac-10 Freshman of the Year
- Pac-10 All-Freshman First Team
- Pac-10 Player of the Week – November 11, 2006

Marcus Williams

- Pac-10 All-Conference

Ivan Radenovic

- Pac-10 Player of the Week – January 1, 2007
- Pac-10 Player of the Week – March 5, 2007
