= 2006–07 NCAA Division I men's basketball rankings =

- Season: 2006–07
- NCAA Tournament: 2007
- Preseason No. 1: Florida
- NCAA Tournament Champions: Florida
NCAA Division I men's basketball rankings


The 2006–07 NCAA Division I men's basketball rankings was made up of two human polls, the AP Poll and the Coaches Poll, in addition to various other preseason polls.

== Legend ==
	Increase in ranking
	Decrease in ranking
	Not ranked previous week
Italics	Number of first place votes
(#-#)	Win–loss record
т	Tied with team above or below also with this symbol

== AP poll ==
The Associated Press (AP) preseason poll was released on November 6, 2006. This poll is compiled by sportswriters across the nation. In Division I men's and women's college basketball, the AP Poll is largely just a tool to compare schools throughout the season and spark debate, as it has no bearing on postseason play. Generally, all top 25 teams in the poll are invited to the NCAA basketball tournament, also known as March Madness.

	Preseason	Week 2 Nov. 13	Week 3 Nov. 20	Week 4 Nov. 27	Week 5 Dec. 4	Week 6 Dec. 11	Week 7 Dec. 18	Week 8 Dec. 25	Week 9 Jan. 1	Week 10 Jan. 8	Week 11 Jan. 15	Week 12 Jan. 22	Week 13 Jan. 29	Week 14 Feb. 5	Week 15 Feb. 12	Week 16 Feb. 19	Week 17 Feb. 26	Week 18 Mar. 5	Final Mar. 12	
1.	Florida (65)	Florida (1–0) (65)	Florida (4–0) (66)	UCLA (4–0) (36)	UCLA (6–0) (55)	UCLA (8–0) (58)	UCLA (9–0) (68)	UCLA (11–0) (71)	UCLA (13–0) (71)	North Carolina (14–1) (64)	Florida (16–2) (43)	Florida (17–2) (42)	Florida (19–2) (45)	Florida (21–2) (72)	Florida (23–2) (72)	Wisconsin (26–2) (35)	Ohio State (26–3) (62)	Ohio State (27–3) (70)	Ohio State (30–3) (71)	1.
2.	North Carolina (7)	North Carolina (0–0) (7)	North Carolina (3–0) (6)	Pittsburgh (6–0) (18)	Pittsburgh (8–0) (15)	Pittsburgh (10–0) (11)	North Carolina (8–1) (1)	North Carolina (10–1) (1)	North Carolina (12–1) (1)	Florida (14–2) (3)	Wisconsin (17–1) (21)	Wisconsin (19–1) (22)	Wisconsin (21–1) (24)	UCLA (20–2)	Ohio State (22–3)	Ohio State (24–3) (31)	UCLA (25–3) (10)	Kansas (27–4) (2)	Kansas (30–4) (1)	2.
3.	Kansas	Kansas (1–0)	Pittsburgh (5–0)	Ohio State (6–0) (15)	North Carolina (6–1) (2)	North Carolina (7–1) (1)	Ohio State (9–1) (3)	Florida (11–2)	Florida (12–2)	Wisconsin (15–1) (1)	UCLA (15–1) (7)	UCLA (17–1) (6)	North Carolina (19–2) (3)	Ohio State (20–3)	Wisconsin (24–2)	Florida (24–3) (4)	Kansas (25–4)	Wisconsin (27–4)	Florida (29–5)	3.
4.	Pittsburgh	Pittsburgh (1–0)	Ohio State (4–0)	Florida (6–1) (3)	Alabama (7–0)	Ohio State (8–1) (2)	Wisconsin (11–1)	Wisconsin (12–1)	Wisconsin (14–1)	UCLA (14–1) (4)	North Carolina (15–2) (1)	North Carolina (17–2) (2)	Ohio State (18–3)	Wisconsin (22–2)	North Carolina (22–3)	UCLA (23–3) (2)	Wisconsin (26–4)	UCLA (26–4)	North Carolina (28–6)	4.
5.	Ohio State	Ohio State (3–0)	UCLA (1–0)	Kansas (5–1)	Ohio State (7–1)	Florida (8–2)	Florida (9–2)	Duke (11–1)	Duke (12–1)	Ohio State (13–2)	Kansas (15–2)	Ohio State (16–3)	UCLA (18–2)	North Carolina (20–3)	UCLA (21–3)	North Carolina (23–4)	Florida (25–4)	Memphis (27–3)	Memphis (30–3)	5.
6.	UCLA	UCLA (0–0)	LSU (2–0)	Alabama (5–0)	Texas A&M (7–0)	Duke (9–1)	Duke (9–1)	Ohio State (10–2)	Ohio State (11–2)	Kansas (13–2)	Pittsburgh (16–2)	Texas A&M (16–2)	Kansas (18–3)	Texas A&M (19–3)	Texas A&M (21–3)	Kansas (23–4)	Memphis (25–3)	Florida (26–5)	Wisconsin (29–5)	6.
7.	LSU	LSU (0–0)	Wisconsin (3–0)	North Carolina (4–1)	Duke (7–1)	Wisconsin (9–1)	Pittsburgh (10–1)	Arizona (9–1)	Arizona (11–1)	Pittsburgh (14–2)	Ohio State (14–3)	Oregon (18–1)	Pittsburgh (19–3)	Pittsburgh (20–3)	Pittsburgh (22–3)	Memphis (23–3)	Texas A&M (24–4)	Texas A&M (25–5)	UCLA (26–5)	7.
8.	Georgetown	Georgetown (1–0)	Alabama (3–0)	Marquette (6–0)	Florida (7–2)	Wichita State (7–0)	Wichita State (8–0)	Alabama (11–1)	Alabama (12–1)	Texas A&M (13–2)	Texas A&M (15–2)	Kansas (16–3)	Duke (18–3)	Memphis (19–3)	Memphis (21–3)	Texas A&M (22–4)	North Carolina (24–5)	North Carolina (25–6)	Georgetown (26–6)	8.
9.	Wisconsin	Wisconsin (1–0)	Duke (3–0)	Texas A&M (5–0)	LSU (4–1)	Alabama (8–1)	Arizona (8–1)	Kansas (10–2)	Kansas (12–2)	Oklahoma State (15–1)	Oregon (16–1)	Pittsburgh (17–3)	Oregon (19–2)	Kansas (19–4)	Kansas (21–4)	Washington State (22–4)	Georgetown (22–5)	Georgetown (23–6)	Texas A&M (25–6)	9.
10.	Alabama	Alabama (1–0)	Kansas (2–1)	LSU (2–1)	Wichita State (6–0)	Arizona (7–1)	Alabama (9–1)	Pittsburgh (11–2)	Pittsburgh (12–2)	Arizona (12–2)	Alabama (14–2)	Duke (16–3)	Texas A&M (17–3)	Butler (22–2)	Washington State (21–4)	Pittsburgh (23–4)	Nevada (26–2)	Nevada (27–3)	Oregon (26–7)	10.
11.	Duke	Duke (1–0)	Texas A&M (4–0)	Duke (5–1)	Wisconsin (7–1)	Kansas (8–2)	Kansas (8–2)	Texas A&M (10–2)	Texas A&M (11–2)	Duke (13–2)	Arizona (13–3)	Memphis (15–3)	Memphis (17–3)	Marquette (20–4)	Nevada (22–2)	Nevada (24–2)	Southern Illinois (25–5)	Washington State (24–6)	Texas (24–9)	11.
12.	Texas A&M	Texas A&M (1–0)	Memphis (1–0)	Wisconsin (5–1)	Kansas (6–2)	LSU (5–2)	LSU (6–2)	Connecticut (10–0)	Oklahoma State (13–1)	Butler (14–1)	Oklahoma State (15–2)	Alabama (15–3)	Oklahoma State (18–3)	Nevada (21–2)	Marquette (21–5)	Georgetown (20–5)	Pittsburgh (24–5)	Louisville (22–8)	Pittsburgh (27–7)	12.
13.	Memphis	Memphis (0–0)	Marquette (4–0)	Washington (5–0)	Washington (6–0)	Texas A&M (7–2)	Texas A&M (9–2)	Oklahoma State (12–1)	Butler (13–1)	LSU (11–3)	Air Force (17–1)	Oklahoma State (16–3)	Butler (19–2)	Oregon (19–4)	Butler (23–3)	Southern Illinois (23–5)	Washington State (23–5)	Pittsburgh (25–6)	Washington State (25–7)	13.
14.	Boston College	Boston College (1–0)	Georgetown (2–1)	Memphis (3–1)	Arizona (5–1)	Connecticut (8–0)	Connecticut (9–0)	Washington (10–1)	LSU (10–3)	Alabama (13–2)	Duke (14–3)	Butler (17–2)	Marquette (19–4)	Washington State (19–4)	Georgetown (18–5)	Air Force (23–4)	Duke (22–7)	Southern Illinois (27–6)	Southern Illinois (29–7)	14.
15.	Arizona	Arizona (0–1)	Arizona (2–1)	Syracuse (6–0)	Butler (9–0)	Oklahoma State (11–0)	Oklahoma State (11–0)	Butler (12–1)	Marquette (13–2)	Oregon (14–1)	Nevada (16–1)	Marquette (17–4)	Nevada (19–2)	Air Force (20–3)	Oregon (20–5)	Butler (24–4)	Texas (21–7)	Texas (22–8)	Nevada (28–4)	15.
16.	Marquette	Marquette (1–0)	Washington (4–0)	Arizona (3–1)	Memphis (5–1)	Gonzaga (9–2)	Butler (11–1)	Wichita State (9–2)	Oregon (13–0)	Tennessee (13–2)	LSU (12–4)	Air Force (18–2)	Virginia Tech (16–5)	Duke (18–5)	Southern Illinois (21–5)	Marquette (21–7)	Louisville (21–8)	Oregon (23–7)	Louisville (23–9)	16.
17.	Washington	Washington (1–0)	Syracuse (4–0)	Wichita State (4–0)	Marquette (8–1)	Washington (7–1)	Washington (8–1)	LSU (7–3)	Notre Dame (12–1)	Clemson (16–0)	Memphis (13–3)	Arizona (13–5)	Air Force (19–3)	Oklahoma State (18–4)	Air Force (21–4)	Vanderbilt (18–8)	Oregon (22–7)	Maryland (24–7)	Notre Dame (24–7)	17.
18.	Syracuse	Syracuse (3–0)	Connecticut (4–0)	Georgetown (3–1)	Gonzaga (8–1)	Butler (10–1)	Memphis (8–2)	Marquette (12–2)	Connecticut (11–1)	Air Force (15–1)	Butler (15–2)	Nevada (17–2)	Washington State (17–4)	Alabama (17–5)	Oklahoma State (19–5)	Duke (20–7)	Butler (26–5)	Marquette (23–8)	Maryland (24–8)	18.
19.	Texas	Texas (2–0)	Georgia Tech (3–0)	Butler (7–0)	Connecticut (7–0)	Memphis (7–2)	Marquette (10–2)	Notre Dame (10–1)	Tennessee (12–2)	Nevada (13–1)	Clemson (17–1)	Clemson (18–2)	Alabama (15–5)	USC (18–6)	Arizona (17–7)	Texas (19–7)	Vanderbilt (19–9)	Butler (27–5)	UNLV (28–6)	19.
20.	Creighton	Creighton (0–0)	Kentucky (2–0)	Connecticut (5–0)	Nevada (7–0)	Marquette (9–2)	Notre Dame (8–1)	Oregon (11–0)	Air Force (13–1)	Memphis (11–3)	Notre Dame (15–2)	Washington State (16–3)	Arizona (14–6)	Kentucky (17–5)	Kentucky (18–6)	Louisville (19–8)	Marquette (22–8)	Notre Dame (23–6)	Marquette (24–9)	20.
21.	Connecticut	Connecticut (1–0)	Nevada (3–0)	Georgia Tech (5–1)	Syracuse (7–1)	Notre Dame (7–1)	Oregon (10–0)	Tennessee (10–2)	Nevada (12–1)	West Virginia (13–1)	Texas (13–3)	LSU (13–5)	Notre Dame (17–4)	Southern Illinois (19–5)	Boston College (18–6)	BYU (20–6)	Virginia Tech (20–8)	Duke (22–9)	Butler (27–6)	21.
22.	Kentucky	Kentucky (0–0)	Tennessee (4–0)	Gonzaga (6–1)	Oklahoma State (9–0)	Oregon (7–0)	Gonzaga (9–3)	Memphis (9–3)	Memphis (10–3)	Washington State (14–2) т	Tennessee (13–4)	Notre Dame (16–3)	Texas (15–5)	Georgetown (16–5)	USC (18–7)	West Virginia (20–6)	Notre Dame (22–6)	Tennessee (22–9)	Winthrop (28–4)	22.
23.	Georgia Tech	Georgia Tech (1–0)	Boston College (1–1)	Maryland (7–0)	Maryland (8–1)	Syracuse (8–2)	Syracuse (9–2)	Air Force (11–1)	Clemson (14–0)	Notre Dame (13–2) т	Virginia Tech (13–4)	Indiana (14–4)	Stanford (14–5)	Vanderbilt (16–7)	West Virginia (19–5)	Oregon (20–7)	USC (21–8)	BYU (23–7)	USC (23–11)	23.
24.	Nevada	Nevada (1–0)	Wichita State (3–0)	Nevada (5–0)	Xavier (6–1)	Air Force (10–1)	Air Force (11–1)	Nevada (10–1)	Washington (10–3)	Connecticut (12–2)	Marquette (15–4)	Virginia Tech (14–5)	Vanderbilt (15–6)	Arizona (15–7)	Indiana (17–6)	Virginia (18–7)	Maryland (22–7)	Winthrop (28–4)	BYU (25–8)	24.
25.	Tennessee	Tennessee (1–0)	Maryland (5–0)	Virginia (4–0)	Georgia Tech (6–2)	Nevada (7–1)	Nevada (9–1)	Clemson (12–0)	West Virginia (11–1)	Texas (11–3)	Kentucky (14–3)	USC (15–5)	Clemson (18–4)	Stanford (15–6)	Alabama (18–6)	Alabama (19–7)	Air Force (23–6)	UNLV (25–6)	Tennessee (22–10)	25.
	Preseason	Week 2 Nov. 13	Week 3 Nov. 20	Week 4 Nov. 27	Week 5 Dec. 4	Week 6 Dec. 11	Week 7 Dec. 18	Week 8 Dec. 25	Week 9 Jan. 1	Week 10 Jan. 8	Week 11 Jan. 15	Week 12 Jan. 22	Week 13 Jan. 29	Week 14 Feb. 5	Week 15 Feb. 12	Week 16 Feb. 19	Week 17 Feb. 26	Week 18 Mar. 5	Final Mar. 12	
		None	Dropped: Texas; Creighton	Dropped: Kentucky; Tennessee; Boston College	Dropped: Georgetown; Virginia	Dropped: Maryland; Xavier; Georgia Tech	None	Dropped: Gonzaga; Syracuse	Dropped: Wichita State	Dropped: Marquette; Washington	Dropped: West Virginia; Washington State; Connecticut	Dropped: Texas; Tennessee; Kentucky	Dropped: LSU; Indiana; USC	Dropped: Virginia Tech; Notre Dame; Texas; Clemson	Dropped: Duke; Vanderbilt; Stanford	Dropped: Oklahoma State; Arizona; Kentucky; Boston College; USC; Indiana	Dropped: BYU; West Virginia; Virginia; Alabama	Dropped: Vanderbilt; Virginia Tech; USC; Air Force	Dropped: Duke	

== ESPN/USA Today Coaches Poll ==
The Coaches Poll is the second oldest poll still in use after the AP Poll. It is compiled by a rotating group of 31 college Division I head coaches. The Poll operates by Borda count. Each voting member ranks teams from 1 to 25. Each team then receives points for their ranking in reverse order: Number 1 earns 25 points, number 2 earns 24 points, and so forth. The points are then combined and the team with the highest points is then ranked #1; second highest is ranked #2 and so forth. Only the top 25 teams with points are ranked, with teams receiving first place votes noted the quantity next to their name. Any team receiving votes after the top 25 are listed after the top 25 by their point totals. However, these are not real rankings: They are not considered #26, #27, etc. The maximum points a single team can earn is 775. The preseason poll was released on November 6, 2007.

	Preseason Nov. 6	Week 2 Nov. 13	Week 3 Nov. 20	Week 4 Nov. 27	Week 5 Dec. 4	Week 6 Dec. 11	Week 7 Dec. 18	Week 8 Dec. 25	Week 9 Jan. 1	Week 10 Jan. 8	Week 11 Jan. 15	Week 12 Jan. 22	Week 13 Jan. 29	Week 14 Feb. 5	Week 15 Feb. 12	Week 16 Feb. 19	Week 17 Feb. 26	Week 18 Mar. 5	Week 19 Mar. 12	Final Apr. 3	
1.	Florida (30)	Florida (1–0) (30)	Florida (4–0) (30)	Ohio State (6–0) (11)	UCLA (6–0) (25)	UCLA (8–0) (26)	UCLA (9–0) (29)	UCLA (11–0) (31)	UCLA (13–0) (31)	North Carolina (14–1) (27)	Florida (16–2) (23)	Florida (17–2) (23)	Florida (19–2) (26)	Florida (21–2) (30)	Florida (23–2) (31)	Ohio State (24–3) (17)	Ohio State (26–3) (29)	Ohio State (27–3) (30)	Ohio State (30–3)	Florida (35–5)	1.
2.	North Carolina	North Carolina (0–0)	North Carolina (3–0)	UCLA (4–0) (13)	Pittsburgh (8–0) (6)	Pittsburgh (10–0) (4)	North Carolina (8–1)	North Carolina (10–1)	North Carolina (12–1)	Florida (14–2) (2)	UCLA (15–1) (6)	UCLA (17–1) (6)	Wisconsin (21–1) (4)	UCLA (20–2) (1)	Ohio State (22–3)	Wisconsin (26–2) (10)	UCLA (25–3) (2)	Kansas (27–4) (1)	Kansas (30–4)	Ohio State (35–4)	2.
3.	Kansas	Kansas (1–0)	Ohio State (4–0) (1)	Pittsburgh (6–0) (5)	North Carolina (6–1)	North Carolina (7–1)	Ohio State (9–1) (2)	Florida (11–2)	Florida (12–2)	UCLA (14–1) (2)	Wisconsin (17–1) (2)	Wisconsin (19–1) (2)	North Carolina (19–2) (1)	Ohio State (20–3)	Wisconsin (24–2)	Florida (24–3) (1)	Kansas (25–4)	UCLA (26–4)	Florida (29–5)	UCLA (30–6)	3.
4.	Ohio State (1)	Ohio State (3–0) (1)	Pittsburgh (5–0)	Florida (6–1) (2)	Ohio State (7–1)	Ohio State (8–1) (1)	Florida (9–2)	Wisconsin (12–1)	Wisconsin (14–1)	Wisconsin (15–1)	North Carolina (15–2)	North Carolina (17–2)	Ohio State (18–3)	Wisconsin (22–2)	North Carolina (22–3)	UCLA (23–3) (2)	Florida (25–4)	Wisconsin (27–4)	North Carolina (28–6)	Georgetown (30–7)	4.
5.	Pittsburgh т	Pittsburgh (1–0)	UCLA (1–0)	Kansas (5–1)	Alabama (7–0)	Florida (8–2)	Wisconsin (11–1)	Duke (11–1)	Duke (12–1)	Ohio State (13–2)	Kansas (15–2)	Ohio State (16–3)	UCLA (18–2)	North Carolina (20–3)	Pittsburgh (22–3)	North Carolina (23–4) (1)	Wisconsin (26–4)	Memphis (27–3)	Memphis (30–3)	North Carolina (31–7) т	5.
6.	UCLA т	UCLA (0–0)	LSU (2–0)	North Carolina (4–1)	Texas A&M (7–0)	Duke (9–1)	Duke (9–1)	Ohio State (10–2)	Ohio State (11–2)	Kansas (13–2)	Pittsburgh (16–2)	Texas A&M (16–2)	Kansas (18–3)	Pittsburgh (20–3)	Texas A&M (21–3)	Kansas (23–4)	Texas A&M (24–4)	Florida (26–5)	UCLA (26–5)	Kansas (33–5) т	6.
7.	LSU	LSU (0–0)	Wisconsin (3–0)	Alabama (5–0)	Florida (7–2)	Wisconsin (9–1)	Pittsburgh (10–1)	Arizona (9–1)	Arizona (11–1)	Pittsburgh (14–2)	Ohio State (14–3)	Oregon (18–1)	Pittsburgh (19–3)	Texas A&M (19–3)	UCLA (21–3)	Memphis (23–3)	Memphis (25–3)	Texas A&M (25–5)	Wisconsin (29–5)	Memphis (33–4)	7.
8.	Georgetown	Georgetown (1–0)	Duke (3–0)	Texas A&M (5–0)	Washington (6–0)	Connecticut (8–0)	Wichita State (8–0)	Alabama (11–1)	Alabama (12–1)	Arizona (12–2)	Texas A&M (15–2)	Kansas (16–3)	Texas A&M (17–3)	Kansas (19–4)	Kansas (21–4)	Pittsburgh (23–4)	North Carolina (24–5)	North Carolina (25–6)	Georgetown (26–6)	Oregon (29–8)	8.
9.	Wisconsin	Wisconsin (1–0)	Alabama (3–0)	Marquette (6–0)	Duke (7–1)	Alabama (8–1)	Arizona (8–1)	Connecticut (10–0)	Kansas (12–2)	Texas A&M (13–2)	Alabama (14–2)	Pittsburgh (17–3)	Oregon (19–2)	Butler (22–2)	Memphis (21–3)	Texas A&M (22–4)	Nevada (26–2)	Georgetown (23–6)	Texas A&M (25–6)	Texas A&M (27–7)	9.
10.	Arizona	Duke (1–0)	Texas A&M (4–0)	Duke (5–1)	Connecticut (7–0)	Wichita State (7–0)	Alabama (9–1)	Kansas (10–2)	Pittsburgh (12–2)	Oklahoma State (15–1)	Oregon (16–1)	Duke (16–3)	Duke (18–3)	Memphis (19–3)	Nevada (22–2)	Nevada (24–2)	Georgetown (22–5)	Nevada (27–3)	Pittsburgh (27–7)	Pittsburgh (29–8)	10.
11.	Duke	Alabama (1–0)	Memphis (1–0)	Washington (5–0)	LSU (4–1)	Arizona (7–1)	Connecticut (9–0)	Pittsburgh (11–2)	Texas A&M (11–2)	Duke (13–2)	Air Force (17–1)	Butler (17–2)	Butler (19–2)	Nevada (21–2)	Washington State (21–4)	Washington State (22–4)	Southern Illinois (25–5)	Pittsburgh (25–6)	Texas (24–9)	Southern Illinois (29–7) т	11.
12.	Alabama	Texas A&M (1–0)	Kansas (2–1)	LSU (2–1)	Wisconsin (7–1)	Kansas (8–2)	Kansas (8–2)	Texas A&M (10–2)	Oklahoma State (13–1)	Butler (14–1)	Arizona (13–3)	Alabama (15–3)	Memphis (17–3)	Marquette (20–4)	Butler (23–3)	Georgetown (20–5)	Pittsburgh (24–5)	Washington State (24–6)	Oregon (26–7)	Wisconsin (30–6) т	12.
13.	Texas A&M	Memphis (0–0)	Washington (4–0)	Wisconsin (5–1)	Kansas (6–2)	Texas A&M (7–2)	Texas A&M(9–2)	Washington (10–1)	Butler (13–1)	Alabama (13–2)	Nevada (16–1)	Air Force (18–2)	Nevada (19–2)	Air Force (20–3)	Marquette (21–5)	Air Force (23–4)	Washington State (23–5)	Southern Illinois (27–6)	Washington State (25–7)	Butler (29–7)	13.
14.	Memphis	Boston College (1–0)	Syracuse (4–0)	Syracuse (6–0)	Butler (9–0)	Washington (7–1)	Oklahoma State (11–0)	Oklahoma State (12–1)	Connecticut (11–1)	Clemson (16–0)	Oklahoma State (15–2)	Memphis (15–3)	Oklahoma State (18–3)	Washington State (19–4)	Air Force (21–4)	Southern Illinois (23–5)	Duke (22–7)	Texas (22–8)	Nevada (28–4)	UNLV (30–7)	14.
15.	Boston College	Washington (1–0)	Arizona (2–1)	Connecticut (5–0)	Arizona (5–1)	LSU (5–2)	LSU (6–2)	Butler (12–1)	Nevada (12–1)	Nevada (13–1) т	Butler (15–2)	Nevada (17–2)	Marquette (19–4)	Oregon (19–4)	Southern Illinois (21–5)	Butler (24–4)	Texas (21–7)	Louisville (22–8)	Southern Illinois (27–6)	USC (25–12)	15.
16.	Washington	Arizona (0–1)	Georgetown (2–1)	Arizona (3–1)	Wichita State (6–0)	Gonzaga (9–2)	Butler (11–1)	Wichita State (9–2)	Air Force (13–1)	Air Force (15–1) т	Clemson (17–1)	Oklahoma State (16–3)	Air Force (19–3)	Duke (18–5)	Georgetown (18–5)	Marquette (21–7)	Butler (26–5)	Notre Dame (23–6)	Louisville (23–9)	Texas (25–10)	16.
17.	Marquette	Marquette (1–0)	Marquette (4–0)	Memphis (3–1)	Memphis (5–1)	Oklahoma State (11–0)	Washington (8–1)	Air Force (11–1)	Oregon (13–0)	Oregon (14–1)	Duke (14–3)	Clemson (18–2)	Washington State (17–4)	Oklahoma State (18–4)	Oregon (20–5)	Duke (20–7)	Notre Dame (22–6)	Butler (27–5)	Notre Dame (24–7)	Washington State (26–8)	17.
18.	Connecticut	Texas (2–0)	Connecticut (4–0)	Butler (7–0)	Gonzaga (8–1)	Butler (10–1)	Memphis (8–2)	Nevada (10–1)	Clemson (14–0)	LSU (11–3)	Memphis (13–3)	Washington State (16–3)	Virginia Tech (16–5)	Kentucky (17–5)	Kentucky (18–6)	West Virginia (20–6)	Oregon (22–7)	Oregon (23–7)	UNLV (28–6)	Tennessee (24–11)	18.
19.	Texas	Connecticut (1–0)	Georgia Tech (3–0)	Maryland (7–0)	Nevada (7–0)	Memphis (7–2)	Air Force (11–1)	LSU (7–3)	LSU (10–3)	Memphis (11–3)	LSU (12–4)	Arizona (13–5)	Notre Dame (17–4)	Alabama (17–5)	Indiana (17–6)	Virginia (18–7)	Louisville (21–8)	Marquette (23–8)	Butler (27–6)	Vanderbilt (22–12)	19.
20.	Syracuse	Syracuse (3–0)	Nevada (3–0)	Nevada (5–0)	Marquette (8–1)	Air Force (10–1)	Nevada (9–1)	Oregon (11–0)	Washington (10–3)	Tennessee (13–2)	Notre Dame (15–2)	Marquette (17–4)	Alabama (15–5)	Southern Illinois (19–5)	Oklahoma State (19–5)	Texas (19–7)	Air Force (23–6)	Maryland (24–7)	Marquette (24–9)	Louisville (24–10)	20.
21.	Georgia Tech	Georgia Tech (1–0)	Tennessee (4–0)	Gonzaga (6–1)	Syracuse (7–1)	Nevada (7–1)	Marquette (10–2)	Clemson (12–0)	Marquette (13–2)	West Virginia (13–1)	Washington State (15–3)	Notre Dame (16–3)	Clemson (18–4)	Notre Dame (17–4) т	Boston College (18–6)	Vanderbilt (18–8)	Marquette (22–8)	Duke (22–9)	Winthrop (28–4)	Nevada (29–5)	21.
22.	Kentucky	Kentucky (0–0)	Kentucky (2–0)	Wichita State (4–0)	Maryland (8–1)	Marquette (9–2)	Clemson (10–0)	Marquette (12–2)	Notre Dame (12–1)	Connecticut (12–2)	Maryland (15–3)	LSU (13–5)	Arizona (14–6)	USC (18–6) т	West Virginia (19–5)	BYU (20–6)	Virginia Tech (20–8)	Winthrop (28–4)	Maryland (24–8)	Winthrop (29–5)	22.
23.	Creighton	Nevada (1–0)	Gonzaga (4–0)	Georgetown (3–1)	Air Force (8–1)	Michigan State (9–2)	Oregon (10–0)	Memphis (9–3)	Memphis (10–3)	Washington State (14–2)	Texas (13–3)	Virginia Tech (14–5)	Texas (15–5)	Georgetown (16–5)	USC (18–7)	Notre Dame (20–6)	Vanderbilt (19–9)	BYU (23–7)	BYU (25–8)	Maryland (25–9)	23.
24.	Tennessee	Tennessee (1–0)	Maryland (5–0)	Georgia Tech (5–1)	Oklahoma State (9–0)	Oregon (7–0)	Gonzaga (9–3)	Notre Dame (10–1)	Michigan State (13–2)	Washington (11–4)	Tennessee (13–4)	Indiana (14–4)	Kentucky (16–5)	Indiana (16–6)	Arizona (17–7)	Oregon (20–7)	USC (21–8)	Virginia (20–9)	Creighton (22–10)	Virginia (21–11)	24.
25.	Nevada	Creighton (0–0)	Texas (3–1)	Texas (4–1)	Michigan State (7–2)	Clemson (10–0)	Michigan State (10–2)	Michigan State (12–2)	Tennessee (12–2)	Maryland (14–2)	Virginia Tech (13–4)	Kentucky (15–4)	UNLV (18–4) т Indiana (15–5) т	Texas (16–6)	Virginia Tech (17–7)	Alabama (19–7)	Virginia (19–8)	UNLV (25–6)	USC (23–11)	Virginia Tech (22–12)	25.
	Preseason Nov. 6	Week 2 Nov. 13	Week 3 Nov. 20	Week 4 Nov. 27	Week 5 Dec. 4	Week 6 Dec. 11	Week 7 Dec. 18	Week 8 Dec. 25	Week 9 Jan. 1	Week 10 Jan. 8	Week 11 Jan. 15	Week 12 Jan. 22	Week 13 Jan. 29	Week 14 Feb. 5	Week 15 Feb. 12	Week 16 Feb. 19	Week 17 Feb. 26	Week 18 Mar. 5	Week 19 Mar. 12	Final Apr. 3	
		None	Dropped: Boston College; Creighton	Dropped: Tennessee; Kentucky	Dropped: Georgetown; Georgia Tech; Texas	Dropped: Syracuse; Maryland	None	Dropped: Gonzaga	Dropped: Wichita State	Dropped: Marquette; Notre Dame; Michigan State	Dropped: West Virginia; Connecticut; Washington	Dropped: Maryland; Texas; Tennessee	Dropped: LSU	Dropped: Virginia Tech; Clemson; Arizona; UNLV	Dropped: Duke; Alabama; Notre Dame; Texas	Dropped: Kentucky; Indiana; Oklahoma State; Boston College; USC; Arizona; Virginia Tech	Dropped: West Virginia; BYU; Alabama	Dropped: Air Force; Virginia Tech; Vanderbilt; USC	Dropped: Duke; Virginia	Dropped: Notre Dame; Marquette; BYU; Creighton	
