= 2006–07 Washington State Cougars men's basketball team =

American college basketball season

2006–07 Washington State Cougars men's basketball

NCAA tournament, Second round
- Conference: Pacific-10 Conference

Ranking
- Coaches: No. 17
- AP: No. 13
- Record: 26–8 (13–5 Pac-10)
- Head coach: Tony Bennett (1st season)
- Home arena: Beasley Coliseum

2006–07 Pacific-10 Conference men's basketball standings
	Conf.				Overall
Team	W		L	PCT	W		L	PCT
No. 7 UCLA	15	–	3	.833	30	–	6	.833
No. 13 Washington State	13	–	5	.722	26	–	8	.765
No. 23 USC^{1}	11	–	7	.611	25	–	12	.676
No. 10 Oregon†^{2}	11	–	7	.611	29	–	8	.784
Arizona	11	–	7	.611	20	–	11	.645
Stanford	10	–	8	.556	18	–	13	.581
Washington	8	–	10	.444	19	–	13	.594
California	6	–	12	.333	16	–	17	.485
Oregon State	3	–	15	.167	11	–	21	.344
Arizona State	2	–	16	.111	8	–	22	.267
† Conference tournament winner As of March 18, 2007; Rankings from AP poll^{1} Holds tie-breaker, ^{2} Holds second tie-breaker.

The 2006–07 Washington State Cougars men's basketball team represented Washington State University for the 2006–2007 NCAA Division I men's basketball season. The head coach was Tony Bennett. The team played its home games in Beasley Coliseum in Pullman, Washington.

== Roster ==
Name	Number	Position	Height	Weight	Year	Hometown
Thomas Abercrombie	20	Guard	6–6	191	Freshman	Auckland, New Zealand
Ryan Bailey	24	Forward	6–6	215	Sophomore	Marysville, Washington
Aron Baynes	11	Center	6–10	270	Sophomore	Cairns, Australia
Antonio Chavers	23	Guard	6–2	200	Redshirt Senior	Fort Worth, Texas
Ivory Clark	33	Forward	6–6	220	Senior	New Orleans, Louisiana
Robbie Cowgill	34	Forward	6–10	211	Junior	Austin, Texas
Jeremy Cross	21	Guard	6–2	207	Redshirt Junior	Vista, California
Caleb Forrest	52	Forward	6–8	228	Sophomore	Pagosa Springs, Colorado
Daven Harmeling	32	Forward	6–7	216	Redshirt Sophomore	Grand Junction, Colorado
Chris Henry	42	Center	6–9	256	Junior	Santa Ana, California
Mac Hopson	1	Guard	6–2	178	Sophomore	Portland, Oregon
Nikola Koprivica	4	Guard	6–6	211	Freshman	Belgrade, Serbia
Derrick Low	2	Guard	6–2	186	Junior	Honolulu, Hawaii
Chris Matthews	5	Guard	6–4	204	Sophomore	Washington, D.C.
Arlen Plaister	50	Forward	6–6	217	Redshirt Senior	Orcas Island, Washington
Taylor Rochestie	10	Guard	6–1	186	Redshirt Sophomore	Santa Barbara, California
Kyle Weaver	25	Guard	6–6	201	Junior	Beloit, Wisconsin

== Schedule ==
Date time, TV	Rank^{#}	Opponent^{#}	Result	Record	Site city, state
Exhibition
November 5, 2006*; 2:00 pm		Central Washington	W 84–40	-	Beasley Coliseum; Pullman, WA
Regular Season
November 10, 2006*; 3:00 pm		vs. UAB; John Thompson Foundation Challenge	W 71–60	1–0	U.S. Cellular Arena; Milwaukee, WI
November 11, 2006*; 5:30 pm		vs. UW–Milwaukee; John Thompson Foundation Challenge	W 74–54	2–0	U.S. Cellular Arena (3,736); Milwaukee, WI
November 12, 2006*; 1:30 pm		vs. Radford; John Thompson Foundation Challenge	W 84–67	3–0	U.S. Cellular Arena; Milwaukee, WI
November 17, 2006*; 8:30 pm		Texas-San Antonio	W 67–44	4–0	Beasley Coliseum; Pullman, WA
November 21, 2006*; 7:00 pm		Idaho State	W 66–60	5–0	Beasley Coliseum; Pullman, WA
November 25, 2006*; 1:00 pm		Boise State	W 65–63	6–0	Spokane Arena; Spokane, WA
November 29, 2006*; 7:00 pm		Portland	W 62–50	7–0	Beasley Coliseum; Pullman, WA
December 2, 2006*; 6:00 pm		at Utah	L 55–69	7–1	Huntsman Center; Salt Lake City, UT
December 5, 2006*; 7:00 pm, FSN-NW		No. 18 Gonzaga	W 77–67	8–1	Beasley Coliseum; Pullman, WA
December 9, 2006*; 9:30 pm		at Idaho	W 66–54	9–1	Cowan Spectrum; Moscow, ID
December 16, 2006*; 2:00 pm		Cal State-Northridge	W 69–50	10–1	Beasley Coliseum; Pullman, WA
December 21, 2006*; 7:30 pm, FSN-NW		vs. San Diego State; 2006 Cougar Hardwood Classic	W 64–54	11–1	KeyArena; Seattle, WA
December 28, 2006; 7:30 pm, FSN		at No. 1 UCLA	L 52–55	11–2 (0–1)	Pauley Pavilion (11,102); Los Angeles
December 30, 2006; 3:00 pm, FSN		at USC	W 58–55	12–2 (1–1)	Galen Center; Los Angeles, CA
January 4, 2007; 7:00 pm		Arizona State	W 75–55	13–2 (2–1)	Beasley Coliseum; Pullman, WA
January 6, 2007; 7:00 pm, FSN-NW		No. 7 Arizona	W 77–73 ^{(OT)}	14–2 (3–1)	Beasley Coliseum (7,181); Pullman, WA
January 11, 2007; 7:30 pm	No. 23	at California	W 73–56	15–2 (4–1)	Haas Pavilion; Berkeley, CA
January 13, 2007; 4:00 pm, FSN-NW	No. 23	at Stanford	L 68–71 ^{(OT)}	15–3 (4–2)	Maples Pavilion (7,238); Palo Alto, CA
January 20, 2007; 3:00 pm, FSN	No. 21	Washington	W 75–47	16–3 (5–2)	Beasley Coliseum; Pullman, WA
January 25, 2007; 7:00 pm	No. 18	Oregon State	W 70–55	17–3 (6–2)	Beasley Coliseum; Pullman, WA
January 27, 2007; 7:00 pm, FSN-NW	No. 18	No. 7 Oregon	L 74–77 ^{(OT)}	17–4 (6–3)	Beasley Coliseum; Pullman, WA
February 1, 2007; 7:00 pm, FSN-NW	No. 17	at No. 22 Arizona	W 72–66	18–4 (7–3)	McKale Center (13,922); Tucson, AZ
February 3, 2007; 4:30 pm, FSN	No. 17	at Arizona State	W 48–47	19–4 (8–3)	Wells Fargo Arena; Tempe, AZ
February 8, 2007; 7:00 pm	No. 14	No. 25 Stanford	W 58–45	20–4 (9–3)	Beasley Coliseum (7,456); Pullman, WA
February 10, 2007; 2:00 pm	No. 14	California	W 59–46	21–4 (10–3)	Beasley Coliseum; Pullman, WA
February 14, 2007; 7:00 pm, FSN	No. 11	at Washington	W 65–61	22–4 (11–3)	Bank of America Arena; Seattle, WA
February 22, 2007; 8:00 pm, FSN	No. 11	at No. 24 Oregon	L 59–64	22–5 (11–4)	McArthur Court; Eugene, OR
February 24, 2007; 5:00 pm, FSN-NW	No. 11	at Oregon State	W 58–54	23–5 (12–4)	Gill Coliseum; Corvallis, OR
March 1, 2007; 7:30 pm, FSN	No. 13	No. 2 UCLA	L 45–53	23–6 (12–5)	Beasley Coliseum (11,618); Pullman, WA
March 3, 2007; 4:00 pm, FSN-NW	No. 13	No. 24 USC	W 88–86 ^{(2OT)}	24–6 (13–5)	Beasley Coliseum; Pullman, WA
Pac-10 tournament
March 8, 2007; 8:30 pm, FSN	(2) No. 12	vs. (7) Washington; Quarterfinals	W 74–64	25–6	Staples Center (16,585); Los Angeles, CA
March 9, 2007; 8:30 pm, FSN	(2) No. 12	vs. (3) USC; Semifinals	L 61–70	25–7	Staples Center; Los Angeles, CA
NCAA tournament
March 15, 2007; 11:30 am, CBS	(3 E) No. 12	vs. (14 E) Oral Roberts; First round	W 70–54	26–7	Arco Arena; Sacramento, CA
March 17, 2007; 2:40 pm, CBS	(3 E) No. 12	vs. (6 E) Vanderbilt; Second round	L 74–78 ^{(2OT)}	26–8	Arco Arena (16,407); Sacramento, CA
*Non-conference game. ^{#}Rankings from Coaches' Poll. (#) Tournament seedings in parentheses. All times are in Pacific Time.
