= 2007 NCAA Division I men's basketball tournament =

Edition of USA college basketball tournament

- Season: 2006–07
- Teams: 65
- Finals site: Georgia Dome, Atlanta, Georgia
- Champions: Florida Gators (2nd title, 3rd title game, 4th Final Four)
- Runner-up: Ohio State Buckeyes (5th title game, 10th Final Four)
- Semifinalists: Georgetown Hoyas (5th Final Four); UCLA Bruins (17th Final Four)
- Winning coach: Billy Donovan (2nd title)
- MOP: Corey Brewer (Florida)
- Attendance: 696,992
- Top scorer: Ron Lewis (Ohio State) (108 points)

The 2007 NCAA Division I men's basketball tournament involved 65 teams playing in a single-elimination tournament that determined the National Collegiate Athletic Association (NCAA) Division I men's basketball national champion for the 2006-07 season. The 69th annual edition of the tournament began on March 13, 2007, with the opening round game and concluded with the championship game on April 2, at the Georgia Dome in Atlanta, Georgia.

Both of the finalists from the year before returned to the Final Four as Florida, who returned its entire starting lineup from the year before, and UCLA advanced. They were joined in the Final Four by Ohio State, who was making its first appearance since their 1999 appearance (later vacated), and Georgetown, appearing for the first time since their national runner-up finish in 1985.

Florida successfully defended their title by defeating Ohio State in the championship 84–75. This marked the second time in 2007 that a Florida team beat an Ohio State team to win a national championship, as Florida's football team won the BCS National Championship Game over Ohio State in January. Florida's Corey Brewer was named the Most Outstanding Player. Florida became the first team to repeat since Duke in 1992, and were the seventh school to repeat overall. The 2007 Gators were the last team to repeat as national champions until the UConn Huskies repeated as national champions in 2024. The Gators would become champions for a third time in 2025.

This tournament was notable because it featured significantly fewer upsets than prior years. There were only 12 games in which a lower-seeded team defeated a higher-seeded team, and eight of these "upsets" were by teams ranked only one seed lower than their opponent. As of 2026, this is the last tournament in which no team seeded 12 or lower won a round of 64 game, while No. 7-seed UNLV was the lowest-seeded team to make it to the Sweet Sixteen. This marked the second time since the tournament expanded to 64 teams that no team seeded No. 8 or lower played in the Sweet Sixteen; the other instance was in 1995. Southland Conference champion Texas A&M-Corpus Christi made their first NCAA appearance.

This was the first Tournament since 2003 that regional sites were designated as "East", "West", "South", and "Midwest", rather than by the names of the host cities.

== Tournament procedure ==
A total of 65 teams entered the tournament. Of that total, 30 of the teams earned automatic bids by winning their conference tournaments. The automatic bid of the Ivy League, which did not conduct a post-season tournament, went to its regular season champion, Penn. The remaining 34 teams were granted "at-large" bids, which are extended by the NCAA Selection Committee.

The initial game on March 13 officially named the opening round game, but popularly called the "play-in game", had Niagara, winner of the Mid-Atlantic Athletic Conference tournament, facing Florida A&M, who won the Mid-Eastern Athletic Conference tournament, for a chance to play top seed Kansas in the first round of the Tournament. Niagara defeated Florida A&M, 77–69, to advance to play Kansas.

All teams are seeded 1 to 16 within their regionals, while the Selection Committee seeded the entire field from 1 to 65.

== Schedule and venues ==
2007 opening round game (orange), and first and second rounds (green)
2007 Regionals (blue) and Final Four (red)

The following are the sites that were selected to host each round of the 2007 tournament:

Opening Round

- March 13
  - University of Dayton Arena, Dayton, Ohio (Host: University of Dayton)

First and Second Rounds

- March 15 and 17
  - HSBC Arena, Buffalo, New York (Hosts: Metro Atlantic Athletic Conference, Canisius College and Niagara University)
  - ARCO Arena, Sacramento, California (Host: University of the Pacific)
  - Rupp Arena, Lexington, Kentucky (Host: University of Kentucky)
  - Lawrence Joel Veterans Memorial Coliseum, Winston-Salem, North Carolina (Host: Wake Forest University)
- March 16 and 18
  - United Center, Chicago, Illinois (Host: Big Ten Conference)
  - Nationwide Arena, Columbus, Ohio (Host: Ohio State University)
  - Spokane Veterans Memorial Arena, Spokane, Washington (Host: Washington State University)
  - New Orleans Arena, New Orleans, Louisiana (Host: Tulane University)

Regional semifinals and finals (Sweet Sixteen and Elite Eight)

- March 22 and 24
  - South Regional, Alamodome, San Antonio, Texas (Host: University of Texas at San Antonio)
  - West Regional, HP Pavilion at San Jose, San Jose, California (Host: San José State University)
- March 23 and 25
  - East Regional, Continental Airlines Arena, East Rutherford, New Jersey (Host: Rutgers University)
  - Midwest Regional, Edward Jones Dome, St. Louis, Missouri (Host: Missouri Valley Conference)

National semifinals and championship (Final Four and championship)

- March 31 and April 2
  - Georgia Dome, Atlanta, Georgia (Host: Georgia Institute of Technology)

== Qualifying teams ==

=== Automatic bids ===
The following teams were automatic qualifiers for the 2007 NCAA field by virtue of winning their conference's tournament (except for the Ivy League, whose regular-season champion received the automatic bid).

Conference	School	Appearance	Last bid
ACC	North Carolina	39th	2006
America East	Albany	2nd	2006
Atlantic 10	George Washington	19th	2006
Atlantic Sun	Belmont	2nd	2006
Big 12	Kansas	36th	2006
Big East	Georgetown	24th	2006
Big Sky	Weber State	14th	2003
Big South	Winthrop	7th	2006
Big Ten	Ohio State	24th	2006
Big West	Long Beach State	8th	1995
Colonial	VCU	8th	2004
C-USA	Memphis	20th	2006
Horizon	Wright State	2nd	1993
Ivy League	Penn	23rd	2006
MAAC	Niagara	3rd	2005
MAC	Miami (OH)	17th	1999
MEAC	Florida A&M	3rd	2004
Mid-Con	Oral Roberts	4th	2006
Missouri Valley	Creighton	16th	2005
Mountain West	UNLV	15th	2000
Northeast	Central Connecticut	3rd	2002
Ohio Valley	Eastern Kentucky	7th	2005
Pac-10	Oregon	9th	2003
Patriot	Holy Cross	12th	2003
SEC	Florida	13th	2006
Southern	Davidson	9th	2006
Southland	Texas A&M–Corpus Christi	1st	Never
Sun Belt	North Texas	2nd	1988
SWAC	Jackson State	3rd	2000
WAC	New Mexico State	17th	1999
West Coast	Gonzaga	10th	2006

Here are the top seeded teams in each regional and their overall seeds.

- Midwest Regional (St. Louis) (top seed: Florida; top overall seed)
- West Regional (San Jose) (top seed: Kansas; fourth overall seed)
- East Regional (East Rutherford) (top seed: North Carolina; second overall seed)
- South Regional (San Antonio) (top seed: Ohio State; third overall seed)

=== Listed by region and seeding ===
Midwest Regional - St. Louis
Seed	School	Conference	Record	Berth Type
#1	Florida	SEC	29–5	Automatic
#2	Wisconsin	Big Ten	29–5	At-large
#3	Oregon	Pac-10	26–7	Automatic
#4	Maryland	ACC	24–8	At-large
#5	Butler	Horizon	27–6	At-large
#6	Notre Dame	Big East	24–7	At-large
#7	UNLV	Mountain West	28–6	Automatic
#8	Arizona	Pac-10	20–10	At-large
#9	Purdue	Big Ten	21–11	At-large
#10	Georgia Tech	ACC	20–11	At-large
#11	Winthrop	Big South	28–4	Automatic
#12	Old Dominion	CAA	24–8	At-large
#13	Davidson	Southern	29–4	Automatic
#14	Miami (Ohio)	MAC	18–14	Automatic
#15	Texas A&M–Corpus Christi	Southland	26–6	Automatic
#16	Jackson State	SWAC	21–13	Automatic

South Regional - San Antonio
Seed	School	Conference	Record	Berth Type
#1	Ohio State	Big Ten	30–3	Automatic
#2	Memphis	C-USA	30–3	Automatic
#3	Texas A&M	Big 12	25–6	At-large
#4	Virginia	ACC	20–10	At-large
#5	Tennessee	SEC	22–10	At-large
#6	Louisville	Big East	23–9	At-large
#7	Nevada	WAC	28–4	At-large
#8	Brigham Young	Mountain West	25–8	At-large
#9	Xavier	Atlantic 10	24–8	At-large
#10	Creighton	Missouri Valley	22–10	Automatic
#11	Stanford	Pac-10	18–12	At-large
#12	Long Beach State	Big West	24–7	Automatic
#13	Albany	America East	23–9	Automatic
#14	Penn	Ivy	22–8	Automatic
#15	North Texas	Sun Belt	23–10	Automatic
#16	Central Connecticut	Northeast	22–11	Automatic

East Regional - East Rutherford
Seed	School	Conference	Record	Berth Type
#1	North Carolina	ACC	28–6	Automatic
#2	Georgetown	Big East	26–6	Automatic
#3	Washington State	Pac-10	25–7	At-large
#4	Texas	Big 12	24–9	At-large
#5	USC	Pac-10	23–11	At-large
#6	Vanderbilt	SEC	20–11	At-large
#7	Boston College	ACC	20–11	At-large
#8	Marquette	Big East	24–9	At-large
#9	Michigan State	Big Ten	22–11	At-large
#10	Texas Tech	Big 12	21–12	At-large
#11	George Washington	Atlantic 10	23–8	Automatic
#12	Arkansas	SEC	21–13	At-large
#13	New Mexico State	WAC	25–8	Automatic
#14	Oral Roberts	Mid-Continent	23–10	Automatic
#15	Belmont	Atlantic Sun	23–9	Automatic
#16	Eastern Kentucky	Ohio Valley	21–11	Automatic

West Regional - San Jose
Seed	School	Conference	Record	Berth Type
#1	Kansas	Big 12	31–4	Automatic
#2	UCLA	Pac-10	26–5	At-large
#3	Pittsburgh	Big East	27–7	At-large
#4	Southern Illinois	Missouri Valley	27–6	At-large
#5	Virginia Tech	ACC	21–11	At-large
#6	Duke	ACC	22–10	At-large
#7	Indiana	Big Ten	20–10	At-large
#8	Kentucky	SEC	21–11	At-large
#9	Villanova	Big East	22–10	At-large
#10	Gonzaga	West Coast	23–10	Automatic
#11	VCU	CAA	27–6	Automatic
#12	Illinois	Big Ten	23–11	At-large
#13	Holy Cross	Patriot	25–8	Automatic
#14	Wright State	Horizon	23–9	Automatic
#15	Weber State	Big Sky	20–11	Automatic
#16	Niagara	MAAC	22–11	Automatic
#16	Florida A&M	MEAC	21–13	Automatic

== Bracket ==
=== Opening Round game – Dayton, Ohio ===
Winner advances to West Regional vs. No. (1) Kansas.

Play-in Game; March 13
16	Florida A&M	69
16	Niagara	77

=== Midwest Regional – St. Louis, Missouri ===
First round Round of 64; March 15–16
1	Florida	112
16	Jackson State	69
New Orleans - Fri/Sun
8	Arizona	63
9	Purdue	72
5	Butler	57
12	Old Dominion	46
Buffalo - Thu/Sat
4	Maryland	82
13	Davidson	70
6	Notre Dame	64
11	Winthrop	74
Spokane - Fri/Sun
3	Oregon	58
14	Miami (Ohio)	56
7	UNLV	67
10	Georgia Tech	63
Chicago - Fri/Sun
2	Wisconsin	76
15	Texas A&M-CC	63

Second round Round of 32; March 17–18
1	Florida	74
9	Purdue	67
5	Butler	62
4	Maryland	59
11	Winthrop	61
3	Oregon	75
7	UNLV	74
2	Wisconsin	68

Regional semifinals Sweet 16; March 23
1	Florida	65
5	Butler	57
3	Oregon	76
7	UNLV	72

Regional finals Elite 8 March 25
1	Florida	85
3	Oregon	77

=== West Regional – San Jose, California ===
First round Round of 64; March 15–16
1	Kansas	107
16	Niagara	67
Chicago - Fri/Sun
8	Kentucky	67
9	Villanova	58
5	Virginia Tech	54
12	Illinois	52
Columbus - Fri/Sun
4	Southern Illinois	61
13	Holy Cross	51
6	Duke	77
11	VCU	79
Buffalo - Thu/Sat
3	Pittsburgh	79
14	Wright State	58
7	Indiana	70
10	Gonzaga	57
Sacramento - Thu/Sat
2	UCLA	70
15	Weber State	42

Second round Round of 32; March 17–18
1	Kansas	88
8	Kentucky	76
5	Virginia Tech	48
4	Southern Illinois	63
11	VCU	79
3	Pittsburgh	84^{OT}
7	Indiana	49
2	UCLA	54

Regional semifinals Sweet 16; March 22
1	Kansas	61
4	Southern Illinois	58
3	Pittsburgh	55
2	UCLA	64

Regional finals Elite 8 March 24
1	Kansas	55
2	UCLA	68

=== East Regional – East Rutherford, New Jersey ===
First round Round of 64; March 15–16
1	North Carolina	86
16	Eastern Kentucky	65
Winston-Salem - Thu/Sat
8	Marquette	49
9	Michigan State	61
5	USC	77
12	Arkansas	60
Spokane - Fri/Sun
4	Texas	79
13	New Mexico State	67
6	Vanderbilt	77
11	George Washington	44
Sacramento - Thu/Sat
3	Washington State	70
14	Oral Roberts	54
7	Boston College	84
10	Texas Tech	75
Winston-Salem - Thu/Sat
2	Georgetown	80
15	Belmont	55

Second round Round of 32; March 17–18
1	North Carolina	81
9	Michigan State	67
5	USC	87
4	Texas	68
6	Vanderbilt	78^{2OT}
3	Washington State	74
7	Boston College	55
2	Georgetown	62

Regional semifinals Sweet 16; March 23
1	North Carolina	74
5	USC	64
6	Vanderbilt	65
2	Georgetown	66

Regional finals Elite 8 March 25
1	North Carolina	84
2	Georgetown	96^{OT}

=== South Regional – San Antonio, Texas ===
First round Round of 64; March 15–16
1	Ohio State	78
16	Central Connecticut State	57
Lexington - Thu/Sat
8	BYU	77
9	Xavier	79
5	Tennessee	121
12	Long Beach State	86
Columbus - Fri/Sun
4	Virginia	84
13	Albany	57
6	Louisville	78
11	Stanford	58
Lexington - Thu/Sat
3	Texas A&M	68
14	Penn	52
7	Nevada	77^{OT}
10	Creighton	71
New Orleans - Fri/Sun
2	Memphis	73
15	North Texas	58

Second round Round of 32; March 17–18
1	Ohio State	78^{OT}
9	Xavier	71
5	Tennessee	77
4	Virginia	74
6	Louisville	69
3	Texas A&M	72
7	Nevada	62
2	Memphis	78

Regional semifinals Sweet 16; March 22
1	Ohio State	85
5	Tennessee	84
3	Texas A&M	64
2	Memphis	65

Regional finals Elite 8 March 24
1	Ohio State	92
2	Memphis	76

=== Final Four – Georgia Dome, Atlanta, Georgia ===
National Semifinals; Final Four; Saturday, March 31
MW1	Florida	76
W2	UCLA	66
E2	Georgetown	60
S1	Ohio State	67

National Championship Game; Monday, April 2
MW1	Florida	84
S1	Ohio State	75

== Game summaries ==
Unless otherwise specified, all games were on CBS, except for the play-in game, which aired on ESPN and two additional games. Those games were broadcast on CSTV except in the natural areas of the teams involved, as those were broadcast on CBS. Times listed are US EDT (UTC−4).

Team names are those listed on the NCAA's scoreboard for the play-in game and first-round matchups. Only UNLV and UCLA use abbreviations; all other names are unabbreviated except for the common abbreviation "A&M".

=== Opening rounds ===
==== First round upsets, close games, and other facts ====
The two major upsets of the first round were #11 Virginia Commonwealth's win over #6 Duke (West Regional), and #11 Winthrop's win over #6 Notre Dame (Midwest Regional). VCU beat Duke, 79–77, on a shot by Eric Maynor with 1.8 seconds left, sending Duke out for the first time in the first round since 1996. Winthrop's highly touted offense built a 21-point second-half lead before surviving a late Notre Dame rally to win, 74–64, earning their first tournament victory in school history. The only overtime game of the first round was in the South Regional, between #7 Nevada and #10 Creighton, ending 77–71 in favor of the Nevada Wolf Pack. Other close games included #3 Oregon squeaking by #14 Miami (Ohio), 58-56 (Midwest Regional), #5 Virginia Tech's win over #12 Illinois 54-52 (West Regional), and #9 Xavier's win over #8 BYU, 79-77 (South Regional). The highest score accumulated by a team in the 2007 tournament went to Tennessee's 121 points over Long Beach State (South Regional), which set a school record. This was the first year since 1993 that a #10 seed did not advance to the second round. It was also only the second time in the last 17 years that a #12 seed failed to advance against a #5 seed. #15 Texas A&M-Corpus Christi had leads of 10-0 and 25–7 in the first half against the #2 Wisconsin Badgers but Wisconsin prevailed 76–63.

==== Second round upsets, close games, and other facts ====
The two biggest upsets of the second round were #6 Vanderbilt's win over #3 Washington State (East Regional) and #7 UNLV's win over #2 Wisconsin (Midwest Regional). Vanderbilt won a heart-stopper, 78–74, in double overtime. UNLV won by six points, 74–68, in their biggest win since the 1990s. Other overtime games included #1 Ohio State's 78–71 win over #9 Xavier (South Regional) and #3 Pittsburgh's 84–79 overtime victory over #11 Virginia Commonwealth (West Regional). Ohio State's Ron Lewis hit a three-pointer with two seconds remaining to force overtime against Xavier, and Pittsburgh fought Virginia Commonwealth's comeback from 19 points down to come up with the victory. The Ohio State win over Xavier had a controversial ending as prior to Lewis's game-tying shot, Buckeye Greg Oden shoved a Xavier player, Justin Cage, in the back and onto the floor. Had an intentional foul been called, Xavier would have been awarded two foul shots and ball possession. Instead, a regular personal foul was called. Subsequently, Xavier missed the second free throw, allowing Lewis to shoot the game-tying 3. Other close games were #3 Texas A&M winning over #6 Louisville, 72-69 (South Regional); #5 Butler's victory over #4 Maryland, 62-59 (Midwest Regional); and #5 Tennessee defeating #4 Virginia, 77-74 (South Regional). This tournament marked the first time since 1995 that a double-digit seeded team did not advance to the Sweet 16 (Midwest #7 seed UNLV was the lowest team in the Sweet 16).

==== Regional semifinals (Sweet Sixteen) upsets, close games, other facts ====
No upsets or overtime games occurred in this round of the tournament, although there were several very close games. In the South Region, #2 Memphis barely defeated #3 Texas A&M as Aggie senior Acie Law, after a solid performance for most of the game, missed an open layup with under a minute left. A controversial clock situation with 3.1 seconds left added to the emotion. #1 Ohio State sneaked past #5 Tennessee, coming back from 20 points down to win, 85–84, with a blocked shot by Buckeye Greg Oden with 0.2 seconds left. In the East Region, #2 Georgetown won possibly the most controversial game of the tournament, beating #6 Vanderbilt, 66–65, on a shot by Jeff Green with 2.5 seconds left. The play was controversial as Green appeared to travel, despite fans and analysts claiming it was a clean drop step.

=== Regional Finals (Elite Eight) ===
The seeds of the Elite Eight teams were four #1s, three #2s, and one #3. This was the lowest combination of seeds in an Elite Eight since seeding began in the NCAA tournament.

South Regional Final

March 24
4:40 PM ET

Recap

Memphis	76–92	Ohio State
Scoring by half: 38-41, 38-51

Alamodome, San Antonio, Texas
Attendance: 26,260

Although Ohio State star freshman Greg Oden got into early foul trouble, a close game at the half turned into a blowout as the Buckeyes went on a 20–8 run to win. Game leaders were Memphis' Jeremy Hunt with 26 points, and Robert Dozier with 11 rebounds. This ended Memphis' 25-game win streak, previously the longest in the nation.

West Regional Final

March 24
7:05 PM ET

Recap

UCLA	68–55	Kansas
Scoring by half: 35-31, 33-24

HP Pavilion. San Jose, California
Attendance: 18,102

After a tight first-half, the Bruins slowly put away the top-seeded Jayhawks in the second-half using their 2006 national championship game experience, along with a strong defense. Shooting percentage was a key factor in the game as UCLA shot 53% to Kansas's 41%. UCLA's Arron Afflalo led all scorers with 24 points while Brandon Rush of Kansas led the Jayhawks with 18. UCLA and Kansas combined for 35 steals, breaking the previous tournament record of 28.

East Regional Final

March 25
5:05 PM ET

Recap

Georgetown	96–84 (OT)	North Carolina
Scoring by half: 44-50, 37-31 Overtime: 15-3

Continental Airlines Arena, E. Rutherford, New Jersey
Attendance: 19,557

North Carolina led for most of the game and the entire second half, but Georgetown rallied from ten points down with six minutes remaining to force overtime. The Tar Heels were outscored 15–3 in the extra session, missing 22 of their final 23 field goal attempts. Georgetown reached its first Final Four since 1985, when John Thompson III's father John Thompson (Jr.) was coach—and Thompson III became the first coach to succeed his father in coaching a team to the Final Four. With North Carolina's loss in the regional final, this marked the first time since the tournament field expanded to 64 teams that no ACC team made it to the Final Four for two consecutive years. The last time that no ACC team made it to the Final Four in consecutive years was in 1979 and 1980.

Midwest Regional Final

March 25
2:40 PM ET

Recap

Oregon	77–85	Florida
Scoring by half: 38-40, 39-45

Edward Jones Dome, St. Louis, Missouri
Attendance: 25,947

In what was actually a close game for most of regulation, Florida's three-point shots, along with a 20–9 run in the second half, amounted to a Gator win. Florida player Lee Humphrey led his team with seven three-pointers, and added up a total of 23 points. In one of the more odd moments of the tournament, Humphrey shot a three-pointer through the side of the net, causing a 10-minute delay as the net was repaired.

=== Final Four ===
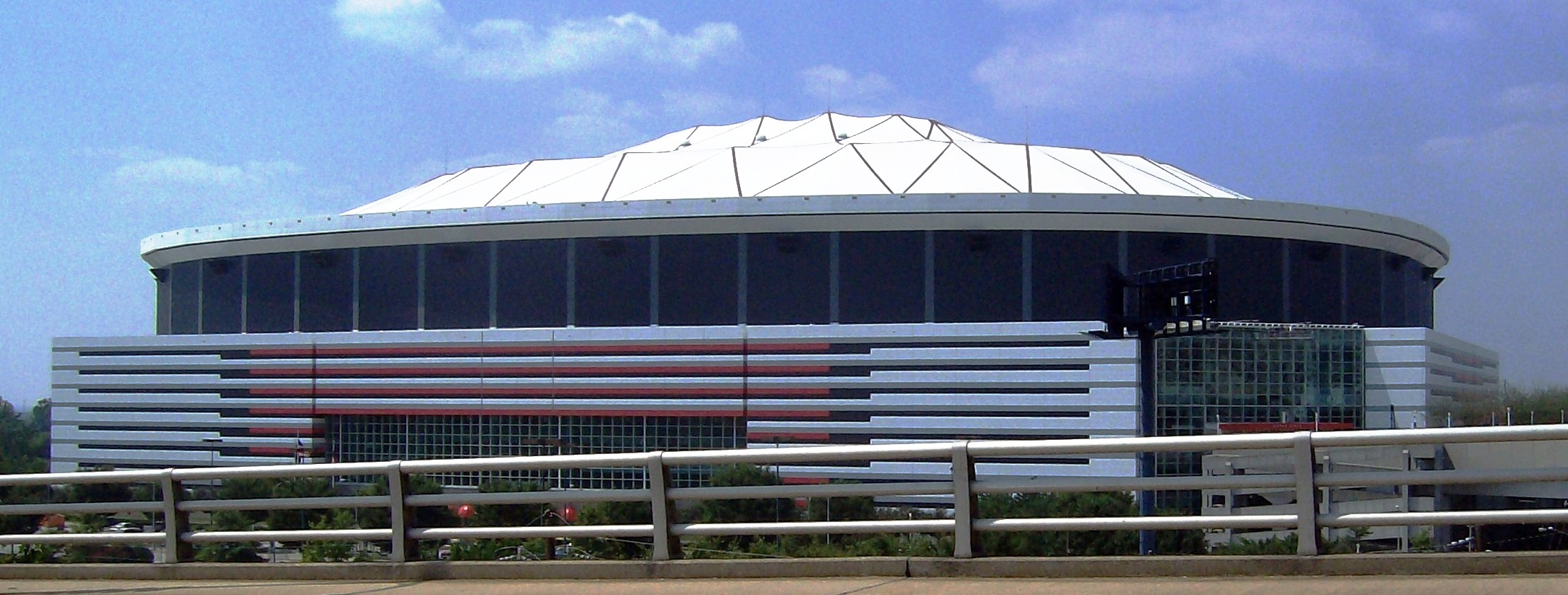
The Georgia Dome was the site of the Final Four and National Championship in 2007.

All of the 2007 Final Four teams had participated in the 2006 tournament. Ohio State was knocked out in the second round by Georgetown, who would lose to Florida in the Minneapolis Regional semifinals. Florida would go on to defeat UCLA in the championship game. The four teams were all previous champions as well—Ohio State (1960), Georgetown (1984), UCLA (several), and Florida (2006)—marking the fourth time that all of the Final Four teams were past champions (joining 1993, 1995 and 1998 Final Fours). Also, it was the first time in nine years that no two Final Four teams were from the same conference.

South-East National semifinal

March 31
6:07 PM ET

Recap

Georgetown	60–67	Ohio State
Scoring by half: 23-27, 37-40

Georgia Dome, Atlanta, Georgia
Attendance: N/A

Ohio State proved to be too much for the Hoyas, even with Ohio State's phenom center Greg Oden sitting most of the game due to foul trouble.

Midwest-West National semifinal

March 31
8:47 PM ET

Recap

UCLA	66–76	Florida
Scoring by half: 23-29, 43-47

Georgia Dome, Atlanta, Georgia
Attendance: 53,510

In the beginning, Florida struggled with UCLA's swarming defense, but ten minutes into the game they took a double-digit lead, and Lee Humphrey, in a performance reminiscent of the previous year's national title game, blew the game open in the second half hitting three consecutive three-pointers. Humphrey's shots proved too much to overcome and UCLA never threatened in the second half.

=== National Championship ===
April 2
9:21 PM ET

Recap

Florida	84–75	Ohio State
Scoring by half: 40-29, 44-46

Georgia Dome, Atlanta, Georgia
Attendance: 51,458

A rematch of a regular season meeting, won 86–60 by Florida in Gainesville, The Gators survived 25 points and 12 rebounds from Buckeyes center Greg Oden with stellar play from guards Lee Humphrey and Taurean Green with inside contributions coming from Al Horford (18 points) and tourney Most Outstanding Player Corey Brewer. Billy Donovan became the third-youngest coach (at age 41) to win two titles. Only Bob Knight (at Indiana) and San Francisco's Phil Woolpert both won two titles at the age of 40.

The Gators are the first team ever to hold the NCAA Division I college football and basketball titles in the same academic year (2006–07) and calendar year (2006 and 2007). Coincidentally, Florida also beat Ohio State (by a score of 41–14) in the College Football Championship, the first time in college sports history that identical matchups and results have occurred in both football and basketball championships. This was also the first time in NCAA D-I men's basketball history that exactly the same starting five were able to win back-to-back titles (Joakim Noah, Corey Brewer, Lee Humphrey, Al Horford, Taurean Green). Florida's Lee Humphrey also set the all-time NCAA Tournament record for three-point field goals made with 47. Humphrey surpassed Bobby Hurley's record of 42.

== Record by conference ==
Conference	# of Bids	Record	Win %	Sweet Sixteen	Elite Eight	Final Four	Championship Game	Champions
C-USA	1	3–1	.750	1	1	-	-	-
SEC	5	11–4	.733	3	1	1	1	1
Pac-10	6	10–6	.625	3	2	1	-	-
Big Ten	6	9–6	.600	1	1	1	1	-
Big 12	4	6–4	.600	2	1	-	-	-
Big East	6	7–6	.538	2	1	1	-	-
ACC	7	7-7	.500	1	1	-	-	-
Horizon	2	2-2	.500	1	-	-	-	-
Missouri Valley	2	2-2	.500	1	-	-	-	-
Mountain West	2	2-2	.500	1	-	-	-	-
Big South	1	1-1	.500	-	-	-	-	-
MAAC	1	1-1*	.500	-	-	-	-	-
Atlantic 10	2	1–2	.333	-	-	-	-	-
CAA	2	1–2	.333	-	-	-	-	-
WAC	2	1–2	.333	-	-	-	-	-

The America East, Atlantic Sun, Big Sky, Big West, Ivy, MEAC, Mid-American, Mid-Continent, Northeast, Ohio Valley, Patriot, Southern, Southland, Sun Belt, SWAC, and WCC all went 0–1.

* The MAAC went 1-1 since Niagara won the Play-in Game.

== Media ==
=== Television ===
==== CBS Sports ====
For the 26th consecutive year, CBS Sports telecast the tournament, and for the 17th consecutive year, broadcast every game from the first round to the championship, with Jim Nantz and Billy Packer calling the Final Four. Nantz was in a stretch in which he would broadcast Super Bowl XLI, the Final Four, and The Masters golf tournament all in a 10-week period.

The complete list of announcing teams follows:

- Jim Nantz, Billy Packer and Sam Ryan (she was only used as Sideline Reporter for the Final Four and NCAA Championship game) – First & Second Round at Chicago, Illinois; East Regional at East Rutherford, New Jersey; Final Four at Atlanta, Georgia
- Dick Enberg and Jay Bilas – First & Second Round at Winston-Salem, North Carolina; West Regional at San Jose, California
- Verne Lundquist and Bill Raftery – First & Second Round at New Orleans, Louisiana; South Regional at San Antonio, Texas
- James Brown and Len Elmore – First & Second Round at Sacramento, California; Midwest Regional at St. Louis, Missouri
- Gus Johnson and Dan Bonner – First & Second Round at Lexington, Kentucky
- Ian Eagle and Jim Spanarkel – First & Second Round at Spokane, Washington
- Kevin Harlan and Bob Wenzel – First & Second Round at Buffalo, New York
- Tim Brando and Mike Gminski – First & Second Round at Columbus, Ohio

Greg Gumbel once again served as the studio host, joined by analysts Clark Kellogg and Seth Davis.

==== Other television ====
CSTV, owned by CBS, telecast the George Washington-Vanderbilt and the Virginia-Albany contests (in addition to the local CBS affiliates nearest to the participating teams in those games, and those using their digital subchannels for simulcasting). Those games served as the first-ever live tourney telecasts on CSTV, which also provided a highlights show after each day of competition.

For the first three rounds of the tournament, games were also shown on DirecTV through the Mega March Madness pay-per-view service and on March Madness on Demand, a broadband Internet video streaming service that was a joint venture between CBS SportsLine (now known as CBSSports.com) and the NCAA.

The opening round game was broadcast on ESPN for the sixth consecutive year.

=== Radio ===
Westwood One once again had the live radio coverage. Kevin Harlan once again served as the play-by-play man at the Final Four with Bill Raftery and John Thompson on color. Thompson the elder is the father of current Georgetown coach John Thompson III.

== Basketball courts ==
During the first- and second-round games in New Orleans, as part of the continuing recovery process from Hurricane Katrina, the NCAA allowed an additional floor decal recognizing the work of Habitat for Humanity's Collegiate Challenge and the NCAA Home Team program through the subregional's host institution, Tulane University. This marked the first time that a logo other than that of the NCAA or an NCAA member school has been allowed at an NCAA-sanctioned championship event. In addition, Tulane student athletes and athletic department personnel built a new house, valued at $75,000 (US), which was paid for by the NCAA and their corporate partner Lowe's, on Girod Street between the New Orleans Arena, site of the games, and the Louisiana Superdome, which has hosted four Final Fours.

Also, for the first time, custom-made, identical courts were used at all four regional sites in San Jose, St. Louis, San Antonio and East Rutherford. Starting in 2010, all tournament games would have the same identical courts.

== See also ==
- 2007 NCAA Division II men's basketball tournament
- 2007 NCAA Division III men's basketball tournament
- 2007 NCAA Division I women's basketball tournament
- 2007 NCAA Division II women's basketball tournament
- 2007 NCAA Division III women's basketball tournament
- 2007 National Invitation Tournament
- 2007 Women's National Invitation Tournament
- 2007 NAIA Division I men's basketball tournament
- 2007 NAIA Division II men's basketball tournament
- Bracketology
