= Tajuan Porter =

American professional basketball player (born 1988)

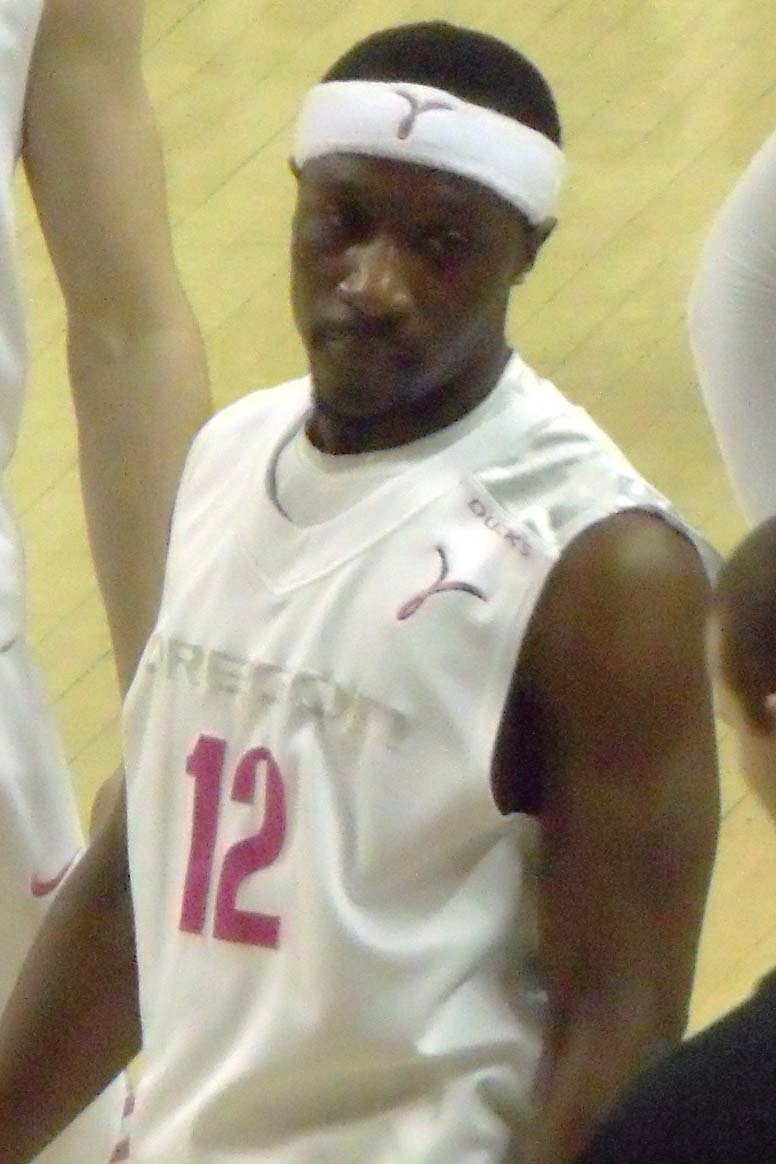
- Porter in 2010

Personal information
- Born: March 9, 1988 (age 38) Detroit, Michigan, U.S.
- Listed height: 5 ft 7 in (1.70 m)
- Listed weight: 155 lb (70 kg)

Career information
- High school: Renaissance (Detroit, Michigan)
- College: Oregon (2006–2010)
- NBA draft: 2010: undrafted
- Playing career: 2010–2020
- Position: Point guard

Career history
- 2011: Halifax Rainmen
- 2011: Entente Orléanaise
- 2012–2013: Rio Grande Valley Vipers
- 2013–2014: Reno Bighorns
- 2014: Sioux Falls Skyforce
- 2014–2015: Reno Bighorns
- 2016: Lille Métropole BC
- 2016–2017: Maghreb de Fes
- 2017: ALM Évreux Basket
- 2019–2020: Lugano Tigers

Career highlights
- Pac-10 All-Freshman Team (2007); Pac-10 tournament MVP (2007)
Medals
Men's basketball
Representing United States
FIBA U19 World Championship
Silver medal – second place	2007 Serbia	National team

Tajuan Marquis Porter (born March 9, 1988) is an American former professional basketball player. He played college basketball for Oregon.

== High school career ==
Porter attended Renaissance High School in Michigan (Porter's former Oregon teammate, Malik Hairston, also attended Renaissance High School). He led Renaissance to two state championships (2004, 2006) and a four-year record of 93–10. As a junior, he averaged 19.6 points, 5.0 rebounds and 5.0 assists per game while garnering first team all-state, all-league and all-city honors. In a 67–50 win against Rogers, he recorded a quadruple-double with 16 points, 10 rebounds, 10 assists and 10 steals. As a senior, he averaged 26.3 points, 6.0 rebounds, 5.0 assists and 5.0 steals per game. He was named first team all-state at the end of both his junior and senior campaigns.

== College career ==
A 5-foot-7-inch (1.70 m) point guard, Porter was one of the shortest NCAA Division I college basketball players. He was considered one of the top freshmen in the country during the 2006–07 season. He had his best career game against Portland State. Against the Vikings, he scored 38 points, including 10–12 from three-point field goal range. The 10 three-point field goals shattered the single game Oregon record. His 110 made three-point field goals is an Oregon single-season record, and is good enough for the all-time Pac-10 freshman record. After the Ducks won the 2007 Pac-10 tournament against the University of Southern California, he was named the tournament's MVP.

Porter holds the school and Pac-10 Conference record for most career 3-pointers made with 345. He also ranks eighth in school history for career field goals made (584) and ninth in career steals (103).

== Professional career ==
Porter went undrafted in the 2010 NBA draft. On November 1, 2010, he was selected by the Maine Red Claws in the 4th round of the 2010 NBA D-League draft. On November 15, 2010, he was waived by the Red Claws. Later that month, he signed with the Halifax Rainmen for the 2011 PBL season. In February 2011, he moved to Entente Orléanaise of France.

In March 2012, he signed with Union Neuchatel Basket of Switzerland but left before playing in a game for them.

On November 2, 2012, he was selected by the Rio Grande Valley Vipers in the 6th round of the 2012 NBA D-League draft. On November 21, 2012, he was waived by the Vipers. On December 14, 2012, he was re-acquired by the Vipers, but again waived on January 29, 2013. On February 6, 2013, he was acquired by the Reno Bighorns.

In November 2013, he was reacquired by the Reno Bighorns. On February 4, 2014, he was waived by the Bighorns. On February 7, 2014, he was acquired by the Sioux Falls Skyforce. On March 18, 2014, he was waived by the Skyforce. On April 4, 2014, he was reacquired by the Bighorns.

On November 2, 2014, he was again reacquired by the Reno Bighorns. On February 19, 2015, he recorded a career-high 41 points and 13 assists in a 142–147 loss to the Austin Spurs.

In February 2016, Porter joined Lille Métropole BC in France. He then spent the 2016–17 season in Morocco with Maghreb de Fes and had a four-game stint with ALM Évreux Basket in France to begin the 2017–18 season. His final professional stint came during the 2019–20 season with the Lugano Tigers in Switzerland.
