= 2004–05 Old Dominion Monarchs basketball team =

American college basketball season

2004–05 Old Dominion Monarchs basketball

CAA tournament & regular season champions

NCAA tournament, First Round
- Conference: Colonial Athletic Association
- Record: 28–6 (15–3 CAA)
- Head coach: Blaine Taylor (4th season)
- Assistant coaches: Jim Corrigan (11th season); Rob Wilkes (3rd season); Travis DeCuire (2nd season)
- Home arena: Ted Constant Convocation Center

2004–05 CAA men's basketball standings
	Conf.				Overall
Team	W		L	PCT	W		L	PCT
Old Dominion †	15	–	3	.833	28	–	6	.824
UNC Wilmington	13	–	5	.722	19	–	10	.655
VCU	13	–	5	.722	19	–	13	.594
Hofstra	12	–	6	.667	21	–	9	.700
Drexel	12	–	6	.667	17	–	12	.586
George Mason	10	–	8	.556	16	–	13	.552
Delaware	7	–	11	.389	11	–	20	.355
William & Mary	3	–	15	.167	8	–	21	.276
James Madison	3	–	15	.167	6	–	22	.214
Towson	2	–	16	.111	5	–	24	.172
† 2005 CAA tournament winner Rankings from AP poll

The 2004–05 Old Dominion Monarchs basketball team represented Old Dominion University in National Collegiate Athletic Association (NCAA) Division I men's basketball during the 2004–05 season. Playing in the Colonial Athletic Association (CAA) and led by fourth-year head coach Blaine Taylor, the Monarchs finished the season with a 28–6 overall record (15–3 CAA). After finishing first in the CAA regular season standings, Old Dominion won the CAA Tournament to secure the conference's automatic bid to the NCAA Tournament. Playing as the No. 12 seed in the Minneapolis region, ODU lost to No. 5 seed and eventual Final Four participant Michigan State in the opening round.

== Roster ==
2004–05 Old Dominion Monarchs men's basketball team
Players
Coaches

Pos.	#	Name	Height	Weight	Year	Previous school	Hometown
G	4	Brandon Johnson	6 ft 1 in (1.85 m)	182 lb (83 kg)	Fr	Edgewater HS	Orlando, Florida
C	30	Sam Harris	7 ft 3 in (2.21 m)	270 lb (122 kg)	Fr	Lake Ginninderra	Launceston, Australia
C	40	Alex Loughton	6 ft 9 in (2.06 m)	240 lb (109 kg)	Jr	St Stephen's School	Perth, Western Australia
F	42	Valdas Vasylius	6 ft 7 in (2.01 m)	210 lb (95 kg)	So	Norfolk Collegiate	Klaipėda, Lithuania

Head coach

- Blaine Taylor (Montana '81)

Assistant coach(es)

- Jim Corrigan (Duke '80)
- Rob Wilkes (Stetson '93)
- John Richardson (Elizabeth City State '95)

Legend

- (C) Team captain
- (S) Suspended
- (I) Ineligible
- (W) Walk-on
- Injured
- Current redshirt

== Schedule and results ==
Date time, TV	Rank^{#}	Opponent^{#}	Result	Record	Site city, state
Exhibition
Nov 2, 2004*; 7:00 p.m.		Elizabeth City State	W 71–42		Ted Constant Center; Norfolk, VA
Nov 11, 2004*; 7:00 p.m.		Carleton	W 82–33		Ted Constant Center; Norfolk, VA
Non-conference regular season
Nov 20, 2004*; 7:00 p.m.		South Alabama	W 63–55	1–0	Ted Constant Center; Norfolk, VA
Nov 22, 2004*; 7:00 p.m.		Kent State; Corpus Christi Challenge	W 64–59	2–0	Ted Constant Center; Norfolk, VA
Nov 25, 2004*; 8:05 p.m.		at TCU; Corpus Christi Challenge	W 67–62	3–0	Daniel–Meyer Coliseum; Fort Worth, TX
Nov 27, 2004*; 3:30 p.m.		vs. Shawnee State; Corpus Christi Challenge	W 99–54	4–0	American Bank Center; Corpus Christi, TX
Nov 28, 2004*; 6:00 p.m.		at Texas A&M–Corpus Christi; Corpus Christi Challenge	L 67–71	4–1	American Bank Center; Corpus Christi, TX
Dec 1, 2004*; 7:00 p.m.		VMI	W 86–38	5–1	Ted Constant Center; Norfolk, VA
Dec 4, 2004; 7:00 p.m.		William & Mary; Rivalry	W 69–56	6–1 (1–0)	Ted Constant Center; Norfolk, VA
Dec 7, 2004*; 8:30 p.m.		at Liberty	W 70–54	7–1	Vines Center; Lynchburg, VA
Dec 12, 2004*; 1:30 p.m.		at East Carolina	W 51–50	8–1	Williams Arena at Minges Coliseum; Greenville, NC
Dec 18, 2004*; 7:00 p.m.		East Tennessee State	W 86–65	9–1	Ted Constant Center; Norfolk, VA
Dec 20, 2004*; 7:00 p.m.		Longwood	W 88–56	10–1	Ted Constant Center; Norfolk, VA
Dec 22, 2004*; 7:00 p.m.		Saint Joseph's	W 66–62	11–1	Ted Constant Center; Norfolk, VA
Jan 2, 2005*; 4:00 p.m.		at DePaul	L 60–73	11–2	Allstate Arena; Chicago, IL
CAA regular season
Jan 5, 2005; 7:00 p.m.		at Drexel	W 60–59	12–2 (2–0)	Daskalakis Athletic Center (2,038); Philadelphia, PA
Jan 8, 2005; 7:00 p.m.		James Madison; Rivalry	W 76–43	13–2 (3–0)	Ted Constant Center; Norfolk, VA
Jan 12, 2005; 7:00 p.m.		at Towson	W 65–56	14–2 (4–0)	Towson Center; Towson, MD
Jan 15, 2005; 2:00 p.m.		George Mason	W 71–58	15–2 (5–0)	Ted Constant Center; Norfolk, VA
Jan 19, 2005; 7:00 p.m.		at Hofstra	W 67–66	16–2 (6–0)	Hofstra Arena; Hempstead, NY
Jan 22, 2005; 7:00 p.m.		UNC Wilmington	W 70–56	17–2 (7–0)	Ted Constant Center; Norfolk, VA
Jan 26, 2005; 7:00 p.m.		Delaware	W 71–62	18–2 (8–0)	Ted Constant Center; Norfolk, VA
Jan 29, 2005; 4:00 p.m.		at VCU; Rivalry	L 71–75	18–3 (8–1)	Siegel Center (7,080); Richmond, VA
Jan 31, 2005; 7:00 p.m.		Drexel	W 86–72	19–3 (9–1)	Ted Constant Center; Norfolk, VA
Feb 2, 2005; 7:00 p.m.		Towson	W 70–59	20–3 (10–1)	Ted Constant Center; Norfolk, VA
Feb 5, 2005; 4:00 p.m.		at UNC Wilmington	W 74–63	21–3 (11–1)	Trask Coliseum; Wilmington, NC
Feb 9, 2005; 7:30 p.m.		at Delaware	W 56–49	22–3 (12–1)	Bob Carpenter Center; Newark, DE
Feb 12, 2005; 4:00 p.m.		VCU; Rivalry	W 82–76	23–3 (13–1)	Ted Constant Center (8,438); Norfolk, VA
Feb 16, 2005; 7:00 p.m.		at George Mason	L 76–82	23–4 (13–2)	Patriot Center; Fairfax, VA
Feb 19, 2005; 7:00 p.m.		at William & Mary; Rivalry	W 82–66	24–4 (14–2)	William & Mary Hall; Williamsburg, VA
Feb 23, 2005; 7:00 p.m.		Hofstra	L 63–66	24–5 (14–3)	Ted Constant Center; Norfolk, VA
Feb 26, 2005; 7:00 p.m.		at James Madison; Rivalry	W 82–60	25–5 (15–3)	JMU Convocation Center; Harrisonburg, VA
CAA tournament
Mar 5, 2005; 12:00 p.m.	(1)	vs. (9) William & Mary; Quarterfinals	W 64–51	26–5	Richmond Coliseum; Richmond, VA
Mar 6, 2005; 3:00 p.m.	(1)	vs. (5) Hofstra; Semifinals	W 72–58	27–5	Richmond Coliseum; Richmond, VA
Mar 7, 2005; 7:00 p.m., ESPN	(1)	vs. (2) VCU; Championship	W 73–66 ^{OT}	28–5	Richmond Coliseum (10,620); Richmond, VA
NCAA tournament
Mar 18, 2005*; 9:30 p.m., CBS	(12)	vs. (5) No. 15 Michigan State; First round	L 81–89	28–6	DCU Center (13,009); Worcester, MA
*Non-conference game. ^{#}Rankings from AP Poll. (#) Tournament seedings in parentheses. All times are in Eastern Time.
