= 2007 CAA men's basketball tournament =

- Classification: Division I
- Season: 2006–07
- Teams: 12
- Site: Richmond Coliseum; Richmond, Virginia
- Champions: VCU (3rd title)
- Winning coach: Anthony Grant (1st title)
- MVP: Eric Maynor
- Attendance: 11,200
- Television: Comcast, ESPN

2006–07 CAA men's basketball standings
	Conf.				Overall
Team	W		L	PCT	W		L	PCT
VCU†	16	–	2	.889	28	–	7	.800
Old Dominion	15	–	3	.833	24	–	9	.727
Hofstra	13	–	5	.722	23	–	9	.719
Drexel	13	–	5	.722	23	–	9	.719
George Mason	9	–	9	.500	18	–	15	.545
Northeastern	9	–	9	.500	13	–	19	.406
Towson	8	–	10	.444	15	–	17	.469
William & Mary	5	–	13	.278	11	–	20	.355
Georgia State	5	–	13	.278	9	–	21	.300
UNC Wilmington	4	–	14	.222	7	–	22	.241
James Madison	4	–	14	.222	7	–	23	.233
Delaware	3	–	15	.167	5	–	26	.161
† 2007 CAA tournament winner Rankings from AP poll

The 2007 CAA men's basketball tournament was an NCAA Division 1 College Basketball Conference tournament that was held at the Richmond Coliseum on March 2–5, 2007, to decide the Colonial Athletic Association conference champion. The winner advanced to the NCAA Men's Division I Basketball Championship tournament, a 65-team tournament to decide a national champion of college basketball.

== Bracket ==
First round Friday, March 2
8	William & Mary	68
9	Georgia State	70
5	Northeastern	77
12	Delaware	67
7	Towson	67
10	UNC Wilmington	52
6	George Mason	73
11	James Madison	62

Quarterfinals; Saturday, March 3
1	VCU	73
9	Georgia State	60
4	Drexel	64
5	Northeastern	50
2	Old Dominion	58
7	Towson	55
3	Hofstra	61
6	George Mason	64

Semifinals; Sunday, March 4
1	VCU	63
4	Drexel	56
2	Old Dominion	63
6	George Mason	79

Final; Monday, March 5
1	VCU	65
6	George Mason	59

== Honors ==
CAA All-Tournament Team	Player	School	Position	Year
CAA All-Tournament Team	Michael Anderson	VCU	Forward	Senior
CAA All-Tournament Team	Folarin Campbell	George Mason	Guard	Junior
CAA All-Tournament Team	Frank Elegar	Drexel	Forward	Junior
CAA All-Tournament Team	Eric Maynor	VCU	Guard	Sophomore
CAA All-Tournament Team	Jesse Pellot-Rosa	VCU	Guard	Senior
CAA All-Tournament Team	Dre Smith	George Mason	Guard	Junior
