= 2006–07 Old Dominion Monarchs basketball team =

American college basketball season

2006–07 Old Dominion Monarchs basketball

NCAA tournament, First Round
- Conference: Colonial Athletic Association
- Record: 24–9 (15–3 CAA)
- Head coach: Blaine Taylor (6th season)
- Assistant coaches: Jim Corrigan (13th season); Rob Wilkes (5th season); John Richardson (2nd season); Travis DeCuire (4th season)
- Home arena: Ted Constant Convocation Center

2006–07 CAA men's basketball standings
	Conf.				Overall
Team	W		L	PCT	W		L	PCT
VCU†	16	–	2	.889	28	–	7	.800
Old Dominion	15	–	3	.833	24	–	9	.727
Hofstra	13	–	5	.722	23	–	9	.719
Drexel	13	–	5	.722	23	–	9	.719
George Mason	9	–	9	.500	18	–	15	.545
Northeastern	9	–	9	.500	13	–	19	.406
Towson	8	–	10	.444	15	–	17	.469
William & Mary	5	–	13	.278	11	–	20	.355
Georgia State	5	–	13	.278	9	–	21	.300
UNC Wilmington	4	–	14	.222	7	–	22	.241
James Madison	4	–	14	.222	7	–	23	.233
Delaware	3	–	15	.167	5	–	26	.161
† 2007 CAA tournament winner Rankings from AP poll

The 2006–07 Old Dominion Monarchs basketball team represented Old Dominion University in National Collegiate Athletic Association (NCAA) Division I men's basketball during the 2006–07 season. Playing in the Colonial Athletic Association (CAA) and led by sixth-year head coach Blaine Taylor, the Monarchs finished the season with a 24–9 overall record (15–3 CAA). After finishing second in the CAA regular season standings, Old Dominion fell in the semifinal round of the CAA Tournament but still secured an at-large bid to the NCAA Tournament. Playing as the No. 12 seed in the Midwest region, ODU lost to No. 5 seed Butler in the opening round.

== Roster ==
2006–07 Old Dominion Monarchs men's basketball team
Players
Coaches

Pos.	#	Name	Height	Weight	Year	Previous school	Hometown
G	4	Brandon Johnson	6 ft 1 in (1.85 m)	182 lb (83 kg)	Jr	Edgewater HS	Orlando, Florida
F	12	Gerald Lee	6 ft 10 in (2.08 m)	250 lb (113 kg)	Fr	Korihait	Uusikaupunki, Finland
G	23	Marsharee Neely	6 ft 2 in (1.88 m)	190 lb (86 kg)	Fr	Walter Hines Page HS	Greensboro, North Carolina
C	30	Sam Harris	7 ft 3 in (2.21 m)	270 lb (122 kg)	Jr	Lake Ginninderra	Launceston, Australia
F	34	Jonathan Adams	6 ft 6 in (1.98 m)	215 lb (98 kg)	So	Baylor School (TN)	Ringgold, Georgia
F	42	Valdas Vasylius	6 ft 7 in (2.01 m)	210 lb (95 kg)	Sr	Norfolk Collegiate	Klaipėda, Lithuania

Head coach

- Blaine Taylor (Montana '81)

Assistant coach(es)

- Jim Corrigan (Duke '80)
- Rob Wilkes (Stetson '93)
- John Richardson (Elizabeth City State '95)
- Travis DeCuire (Montana '94)

Legend

- (C) Team captain
- (S) Suspended
- (I) Ineligible
- (W) Walk-on
- Injured
- Current redshirt

Roster
Last update: 9–7–2019

== Schedule and results ==
Date time, TV	Rank^{#}	Opponent^{#}	Result	Record	Site city, state
Exhibition
Oct 31, 2006*; 7:00 p.m.		Virginia State	W 90–74		Ted Constant Center; Norfolk, VA
Nov 6, 2006*; 7:00 p.m.		Barton	W 71–49		Ted Constant Center; Norfolk, VA
Non-conference regular season
Nov 10, 2006*; 6:30 p.m.		Monmouth; Cox Classic	W 54–40	1–0	Ted Constant Center; Norfolk, VA
Nov 11, 2006*; 4:00 p.m.		Arkansas State; Cox Classic	W 69–61	2–0	Ted Constant Center; Norfolk, VA
Nov 12, 2006*; 4:30 p.m.		Clemson; Cox Classic	L 70–74	2–1	Ted Constant Center; Norfolk, VA
Nov 17, 2006*; 7:00 p.m.		Florida Atlantic	W 70–55	3–1	Ted Constant Center; Norfolk, VA
Nov 19, 2006*; 6:00 p.m.		at No. 8 Georgetown	W 75–62	4–1	McDonough Gymnasium (2,500); Washington, D.C.
Nov 25, 2006*; 12:00 p.m.		Richmond	W 69–52	5–1	Ted Constant Center; Norfolk, VA
Nov 29, 2006*; 7:30 p.m.		at Marist	L 71–84	5–2	McCann Center; Poughkeepsie, NY
Dec 2, 2006; 12:00 p.m.		James Madison; Rivalry	W 70–57	6–2 (1–0)	Ted Constant Center; Norfolk, VA
Dec 6, 2006*; 7:00 p.m.		at Virginia Tech	L 55–72	6–3	Cassell Coliseum; Blacksburg, VA
Dec 16, 2006*; 7:00 p.m.		South Carolina State	W 74–57	7–3	Ted Constant Center; Norfolk, VA
Dec 18, 2006*; 7:00 p.m.		UAB	W 56–42	8–3	Ted Constant Center; Norfolk, VA
Dec 29, 2006*; 7:00 p.m.		Winthrop	L 65–71	8–4	Ted Constant Center (6,252); Norfolk, VA
CAA regular season
Jan 3, 2007; 7:00 p.m.		at Northeastern	W 73–67	9–4 (2–0)	Matthews Arena; Boston, MA
Jan 6, 2007; 2:00 p.m., Comcast		George Mason	W 65–63	10–4 (3–0)	Ted Constant Center; Norfolk, VA
Jan 8, 2007; 7:00 p.m.		at Hofstra	L 58–70	10–5 (3–1)	Mack Sports Complex; Hempstead, NY
Jan 10, 2007; 7:00 p.m.		Delaware	W 83–48	11–5 (4–1)	Ted Constant Center; Norfolk, VA
Jan 13, 2007; 4:00 p.m., CSN		Drexel	W 84–57	12–5 (5–1)	Ted Constant Center (7,092); Norfolk, VA
Jan 17, 2007; 7:00 p.m.		at James Madison; Rivalry	L 65–72	12–6 (5–2)	JMU Convocation Center; Harrisonburg, VA
Jan 20, 2007; 5:30 p.m.		at VCU; Rivalry	L 75–80	12–7 (5–3)	Siegel Center (7,694); Richmond, VA
Jan 24, 2007; 7:00 p.m.		William & Mary; Rivalry	W 59–44	13–7 (6–3)	Ted Constant Center; Norfolk, VA
Jan 27, 2007; 4:00 p.m.		at UNC Wilmington	W 86–70	14–7 (7–3)	Trask Coliseum; Wilmington, NC
Jan 29, 2007; 7:00 p.m.		Georgia State; Rivalry	W 92–57	15–7 (8–3)	Ted Constant Center; Norfolk, VA
Feb 1, 2007; 7:00 p.m., ESPNU		at Drexel	W 62–52	16–7 (9–3)	Daskalakis Athletic Center (2,103); Philadelphia, PA
Feb 3, 2007; 6:00 p.m., ESPNU		at George Mason	W 66–56	17–7 (10–3)	Patriot Center; Fairfax, VA
Feb 7, 2007; 7:00 p.m.		at Georgia State	W 68–55	18–7 (11–3)	GSU Sports Arena; Atlanta, GA
Feb 10, 2007; 12:00 p.m.		VCU; Rivalry	W 79–63	19–7 (12–3)	Ted Constant Center; Norfolk, VA
Feb 13, 2007; 7:00 p.m.		Hofstra	W 96–82	20–7 (13–3)	Ted Constant Center; Norfolk, VA
Feb 17, 2007*; 6:00 p.m.		at Toledo; ESPN BracketBusters	W 73–70	21–7	John F. Savage Hall; Toledo, OH
Feb 21, 2007; 7:00 p.m.		Towson	W 79–65	22–7 (14–3)	Ted Constant Center; Norfolk, VA
Feb 24, 2007; 2:00 p.m.		at William & Mary; Rivalry	W 62–57	23–7 (15–3)	Kaplan Arena; Williamsburg, VA
CAA tournament
Mar 3, 2007*; 6:00 p.m.	(2)	vs. (7) Towson; Quarterfinals	W 58–55	24–7	Richmond Coliseum; Richmond, Virginia
Mar 4, 2007*; 5:30 p.m.	(2)	vs. (6) George Mason; Semifinals	L 63–79	24–8	Richmond Coliseum; Richmond, Virginia
NCAA tournament
Mar 15, 2007*; 2:50 p.m., CBS	(12 MW)	vs. (5 MW) No. 21 Butler; First Round	L 46–57	24–9	HSBC Arena (18,649); Buffalo, New York
*Non-conference game. ^{#}Rankings from AP Poll. (#) Tournament seedings in parentheses. MW=Midwest. All times are in Eastern Time.
