= George Wythe High School =

George Wythe High School may refer to:

- George Wythe High School (Wytheville, Virginia), part of Wythe County Public Schools in Wythe County, Virginia, U.S.
- Richmond High School for the Arts, part of Richmond Public Schools in Richmond, Virginia; formerly named George Wythe High School
