= 2005 CAA men's basketball tournament =

- Classification: Division I
- Season: 2004–05
- Teams: 10
- Site: Richmond Coliseum; Richmond, Virginia
- Champions: Old Dominion (6th title)
- Winning coach: Blaine Taylor (1st title)
- MVP: Alex Loughton (Old Dominion)
- Television: ESPN

2004–05 CAA men's basketball standings
	Conf.				Overall
Team	W		L	PCT	W		L	PCT
Old Dominion †	15	–	3	.833	28	–	6	.824
UNC Wilmington	13	–	5	.722	19	–	10	.655
VCU	13	–	5	.722	19	–	13	.594
Hofstra	12	–	6	.667	21	–	9	.700
Drexel	12	–	6	.667	17	–	12	.586
George Mason	10	–	8	.556	16	–	13	.552
Delaware	7	–	11	.389	11	–	20	.355
William & Mary	3	–	15	.167	8	–	21	.276
James Madison	3	–	15	.167	6	–	22	.214
Towson	2	–	16	.111	5	–	24	.172
† 2005 CAA tournament winner Rankings from AP poll

The 2005 CAA men's basketball tournament was held from March 4–7, 2005 at the Richmond Coliseum in Richmond, Virginia. The winner of the tournament was Old Dominion, who received an automatic bid to the 2005 NCAA Men's Division I Basketball Tournament.

== Bracket ==
First round Friday, March 4
8	James Madison	54
9	William & Mary	68
7	Delaware	76
10	Towson	56

Quarterfinals; Saturday, March 5
1	Old Dominion	64
9	William & Mary	51
4	Drexel	77
5	Hofstra	'89
2	VCU	74
7	Delaware	61
3	UNC Wilmington	60
6	George Mason	47

Semifinals; Sunday, March 6
1	Old Dominion	72
5	Hofstra	58
2	VCU	55
3	UNC Wilmington	46

Final; Monday, March 7
1	Old Dominion	73
2	VCU	66^{OT}

== Honors ==
CAA All-Tournament Team	Player	School	Position
CAA All-Tournament Team	Alex Loughton	Old Dominion	Forward
CAA All-Tournament Team	Antoine Agudio	Hofstra	Guard
CAA All-Tournament Team	Isaiah Hunter	Old Dominion	Guard
CAA All-Tournament Team	Nick George	VCU	Forward
CAA All-Tournament Team	Drew Williamson	Old Dominion	Guard
CAA All-Tournament Team	Jesse Pellot-Rosa	VCU	Guard
