= Walkup Skydome =

Multi-purpose stadium at NAU in Flagstaff, Arizona

J. Lawrence Walkup Skydome
- "Skydome"
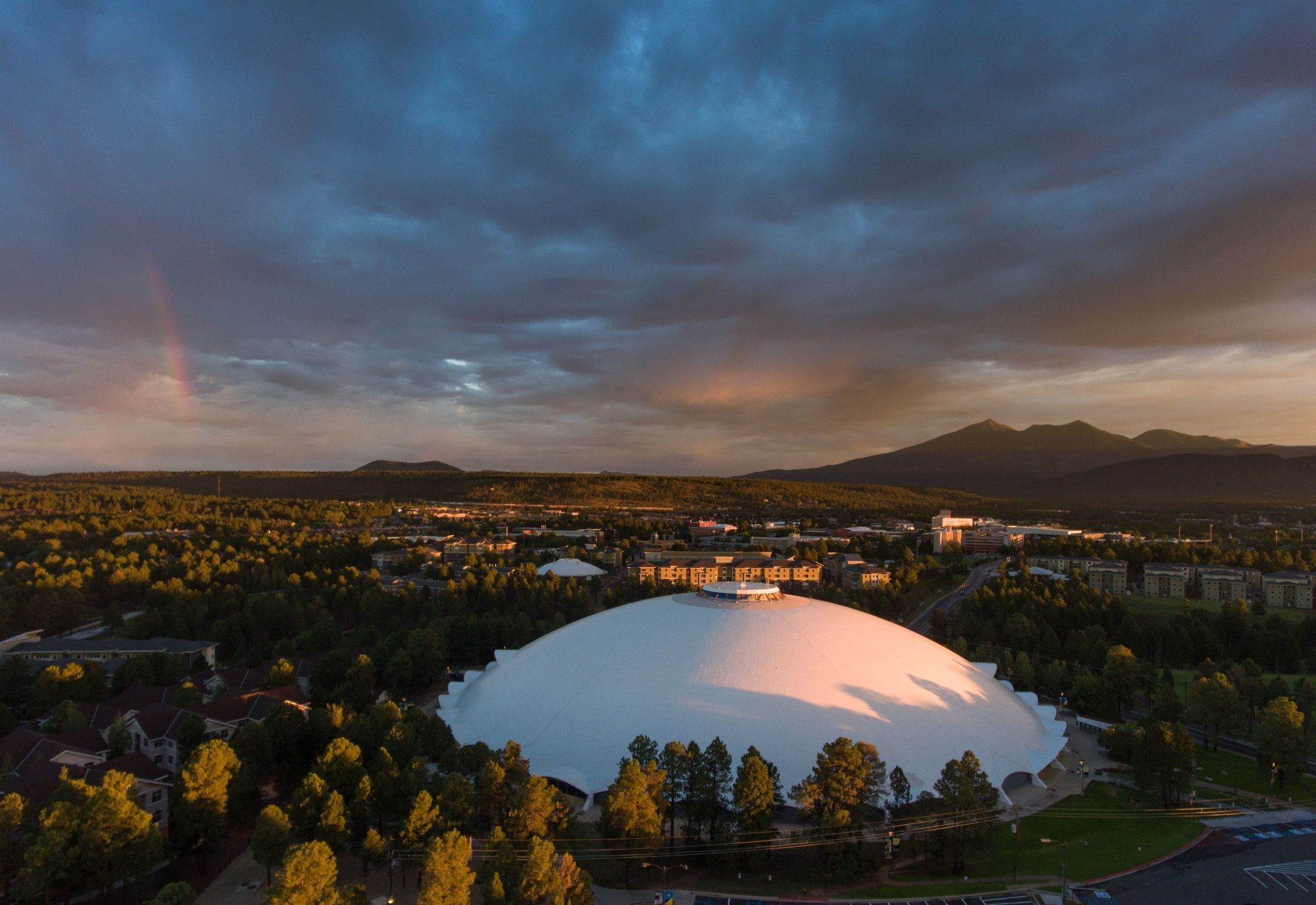
- NAU skydome (bottom)

- Location within the United States Location within Arizona
- Interactive map of J. Lawrence Walkup Skydome
- Former names: NAU Skydome (1977–1979)
- Address: 1705 S. San Francisco St.
- Location: Northern Arizona University; Flagstaff, Arizona, U.S.
- Coordinates: 35.1805°N 111.6525°W
- Elevation: 6,880 feet (2,095 m) AMSL
- Owner: Northern Arizona University
- Operator: Northern Arizona University
- Capacity: 11,230 – total 10,000 – permanent seats 1,230 seats in ten sections of portable bleachers - basketball = 7,000
- Surface: FieldTurf (2002–present); AstroTurf (1977–2001)

Construction
- Groundbreaking: September 4, 1975
- Opened: September 17, 1977; 48 years ago
- Renovated: 2010–2011
- Cost: $8.0 miilion ($42.5 million in 2025)
- Architects: Rossman and Partners
- Structural engineer: John K. Parsons
- General contractor: Mardian Construction Company

Tenant
- NAU Lumberjacks (NCAA) (1977–present)

The J. Lawrence Walkup Skydome is an indoor multipurpose stadium located on the campus of Northern Arizona University (NAU) in Flagstaff, Arizona. It is primarily used as the home of the NAU Lumberjacks football and both men's and women's basketball teams of the Big Sky Conference. The seating capacity is 11,230, with 10,000 permanent seats and 1,230 seats in portable bleachers.

== History ==
When it opened on September 15, 1977, the stadium did not have a name. The inaugural football game was a one-point conference win over Montana before 12,860 on September 17; it hosted five games that first season, with an average attendance of 13,029. NAU football was previously played outdoors on natural grass at Lumberjack Stadium. The dome hosted the Big Sky men's basketball tournament in 1987, 1997, 1998, and 2006.

For its first six years, the Walkup Skydome was the world's largest clear-span timber dome, until the completion of the Tacoma Dome in Tacoma, Washington, in 1983. The architect was Wendell Rossman of Phoenix, also responsible for many other buildings on the surrounding NAU campus. Mardian Construction Company also of Phoenix was general contractor. The wood used in construction of Walkup Skydome was southern yellow pine. At its launching in 1977, it was the third indoor football stadium in the Big Sky Conference: ICCU Dome at Idaho State in Pocatello opened in 1970 (as the "Minidome") and the Kibbie Dome at Idaho in Moscow was enclosed in 1975, after four years as an outdoor venue.

The Skydome is named after J. Lawrence Walkup (1914–2002), the president of NAU from 1957 to 1979, a period of tremendous growth for the university. During an era of tight budgets in the mid-1970s, he creatively coordinated financing for the venue. More than half of the $8 million project came from voluntary student fee increases, supplemented with $1.5 million in legislative funding and a campus fund of $2 million from two decades of vending-machine revenue. The athletic director at NAU at the time was Hank Anderson, who served from 1974 through 1983. The two-year-old Skydome was named for Walkup after his retirement in 1979.

The elevation at street level is 6,880 feet (2,095 m) above sea level, the highest among NCAA Division I FCS football stadiums and second among Division I football venues only to an FBS venue, Wyoming's War Memorial Stadium, by 335 feet (102 m). From its 1977 opening until 2002, the football playing surface was AstroTurf; this was changed to infilled FieldTurf in 2002.

=== Renovation ===
The building underwent a major renovation from December 2010 to September 2011 at a cost of $26 million. The scope of the project included bringing the fire, life, and safety up to code while remodeling the bathrooms, concourse, offices, suites, locker rooms, and press box. The athletic training and equipment on the main floor were also remodeled and three elevators were added to the complex. Fans now enter the building to a panoramic view of the field on the east and west concourses. Capacity was reduced to 10,000, but it now features 21-in-wide chair-back seating.

== Other uses ==
Besides sporting events, the arena is also used for commencement ceremonies, concerts, and other events such as conventions and trade shows. The arena floor features 97,000 square feet (9,000 m^{2}) of space.

The Walkup Skydome was formerly used by the NFL's Arizona Cardinals during their summer training camp, held at NAU. The Cardinals could move inside to conduct practice when the weather was unsuitable outdoors.

== See also ==
- List of NCAA Division I FCS football stadiums
- List of NCAA Division I basketball arenas
- List of convention centers in the United States
