= 2004–05 George Mason Patriots men's basketball team =

American college basketball season

2004–05 George Mason Patriots men's basketball
- Conference: Colonial Athletic Association
- Record: 16–13 (10–8 CAA)
- Head coach: Jim Larranaga
- Assistant coaches: Bill Courtney; Scott Cherry; Eric Konkol
- Home arena: Patriot Center

2004–05 CAA men's basketball standings
	Conf.				Overall
Team	W		L	PCT	W		L	PCT
Old Dominion †	15	–	3	.833	28	–	6	.824
UNC Wilmington	13	–	5	.722	19	–	10	.655
VCU	13	–	5	.722	19	–	13	.594
Hofstra	12	–	6	.667	21	–	9	.700
Drexel	12	–	6	.667	17	–	12	.586
George Mason	10	–	8	.556	16	–	13	.552
Delaware	7	–	11	.389	11	–	20	.355
William & Mary	3	–	15	.167	8	–	21	.276
James Madison	3	–	15	.167	6	–	22	.214
Towson	2	–	16	.111	5	–	24	.172
† 2005 CAA tournament winner Rankings from AP poll

The 2004–05 George Mason Patriots men's basketball team began their 39th season of collegiate play on November 11, 2004, versus Indiana University-Purdue University Fort Wayne at the Coaches vs. Cancer Classic tournament in Memphis, TN. The Patriots won that game, and finished the season with a record of 16 wins and 13 losses.

== Season notes ==
- On June 3, 2005, the team hired James Johnson and promoted Chris Caputo to assistant coaches.
- The 2004–05 George Mason Patriots were predicted to finish 3rd in the Colonial Athletic Association.

== Awards ==
Second Team All-CAA

- Lamar Butler
- Jai Lewis

Third Team All-CAA

- Tony Skinn

CAA All-Rookie Team

- Folarin Campbell
- Will Thomas
- John Vaughan

CAA Player of the Week

- Lamar Butler – Jan. 3
- Tony Skinn – Feb. 3

CAA Rookie of the Week

- Folarin Campbell – Dec. 29
- Will Thomas – Jan. 18
- Folarin Campbell – Feb. 3
- John Vaughan – Feb. 15

== 2004–2005 roster ==
Name	Number	Pos.	Height	Weight	Year	Hometown	High School
Tim Burns	12	G	6–3	185	Sophomore	Greenfield, MA	Worcester Academy
Lamar Butler	22	G	6–2	170	Junior (RS)	Fort Washington, MD	Oxen Hill
Folarin Campbell	42	G	6–4	195	Freshman	Silver Spring, MD	Springbrook
Jordan Carter	2	G	6–0	165	Freshman	Indianapolis, IN	Brebeuf Jesuit Prep
Makan Konate	3	F	6–7	215	Sophomore	Mali	Worcester Academy
Jai Lewis	55	F	6–7	275	Junior	Aberdeen, MD	Aberdeen
Gabe Norwood	5	F	6–5	175	Sophomore	State College, PA	State College
Tony Skinn	1	G	6–1	170	Junior	Takoma Park, MD	Takoma Academy
Will Thomas	34	F	6–7	220	Freshman	Baltimore, MD	Mount St. Joseph's
Jesus Urbina	13	F	6–7	225	Sophomore	Venezuela	Amelia Academy
John Vaughan	23	G	6–3	165	Freshman	Laurel, MD	Laurel

== Player stats ==
Player	Games	MPG	PPG	RPG	FG %	3P%	FT %	Assists	Steals
Lamar Butler	29	31.6	15.7	2.4	.455	.431	.736	70	33
Tony Skinn	27	26.2	14.4	2.9	.405	.342	.757	59	22
Jai Lewis	29	29.5	13.0	7.5	.498	.286	.715	56	40
John Vaughan	29	23.4	7.5	3.3	.418	.324	.729	43	24
Folarin Campbell	29	16.9	6.4	2.2	.408	.305	.689	38	20
Gabe Norwood	29	26.3	5.8	3.8	.438	.133	.684	74	47
Will Thomas	29	23.0	5.7	5.6	.611	.000	.475	22	16
Tim Burns	23	8.7	2.7	0.9	.368	.415	.750	10	7
Jesus Urbina	29	10.9	2.7	2.7	.403	.000	.643	12	10
Jordan Carter	29	8.3	1.0	0.7	.385	.300	.625	33	10
Charles Makings	10	2.8	0.3	0.3	.333	.000	.500	1	0
Makan Konate	9	2.1	0.0	0.2	.000	.000	.000	0	1

== Schedule and results ==
Date time, TV	Rank^{#}	Opponent^{#}	Result	Record	Site city, state
Regular season
November 11, 2004*; 5:35 p.m.		vs. IPFW; Coaches vs. Cancer	W 69–51	1–0	Memphis, TN
November 13, 2004*; 8:00 p.m.		at Memphis	L 58–75	1–1	Memphis, TN
November 27, 2004*; 7:00 p.m.		Duquesne	W 79–58	2–1	Patriot Center; Fairfax, VA
December 1, 2004; 7:00 p.m.		Towson	W 79–61	3–1 (1–0)	Patriot Center; Fairfax, VA
December 4, 2004*; 1:00 p.m.		vs. No. 12 Maryland; BB&T Classic Opening Round	L 54–78	3–2	MCI Center; Washington, DC
December 5, 2004*; 12:30 p.m.		vs. No. 11 Michigan State; BB&T Classic Consolation Game	L 60–66	3–3	MCI Center; Washington, DC
December 8, 2004*; 7:00 p.m.		Iona	W 70–65	4–3	Patriot Center; Fairfax, VA
December 22, 2004*; 7:00 p.m.		at St. Bonaventure	W 95–58	5–3	Reilly Center; St. Bonaventure, NY
December 28, 2004*; 7:00 p.m.		at McNeese State	L 76–87	5–4	Burton Coliseum; Lake Charles, LA
December 30, 2004*; 7:00 p.m.		at Morehead State	W 76–65	6–4	Ellis Johnson Arena; Morehead, KY
January 5, 2005; 7:00 p.m.		VCU	L 74–81	6–5 (1–1)	Patriot Center; Fairfax, VA
January 8, 2005; 4:30 p.m.		UNC Wilmington	W 74–69	7–5 (2–1)	Patriot Center; Fairfax, VA
January 12, 2005; 4:30 p.m.		at Delaware	L 78–81 ^{OT}	7–6 (2–2)	Bob Carpenter Center; Newark, DE
January 15, 2005; 2:00 p.m.		at Old Dominion	L 58–71	7–7 (2–3)	Constant Convocation Center; Norfolk, VA
January 19, 2005; 7:00 p.m.		Drexel	L 59–66	7–8 (2–4)	Patriot Center; Fairfax, VA
January 22, 2005; 7:00 p.m.		at James Madison	W 77–58	8–8 (3–4)	JMU Convocation Center; Harrisonburg, VA
January 26, 2005; 7:00 p.m.		Hofstra	W 94–78	9–8 (4–4)	Patriot Center; Fairfax, VA
January 29, 2005; 2:00 p.m.		William & Mary	W 95–62	10–8 (5–4)	Patriot Center; Fairfax, VA
January 31, 2005; 2:00 p.m.		Delaware	W 82–68	11–8 (6–4)	Patriot Center; Fairfax, VA
February 2, 2006; 7:00 p.m.		at UNC Wilmington	L 67–71	11–9 (6–5)	Trask Coliseum; Wilmington, NC
February 5, 2005; 7:00 p.m.		James Madison	W 89–67	12–9 (7–5)	Patriot Center; Fairfax, VA
February 9, 2005; 7:00 p.m.		at Towson	W 62–57	13–9 (8–5)	Towson Center; Towson, MD
February 12, 2005; 7:00 p.m.		at William & Mary	W 104–99 ^{2OT}	14–9 (9–5)	William & Mary Hall; Williamsburg, VA
February 14, 2005; 7:30 p.m.		at VCU	L 81–89	14–10 (9–6)	Siegel Center; Richmond, VA
February 16, 2005; 7:00 p.m.		Old Dominion	W 74–58	15–10 (10–6)	Patriot Center; Fairfax, VA
February 19, 2005*; 4:00 p.m.		Manhattan; Homecoming	W 78–66	16–10	Patriot Center; Fairfax, VA
February 23, 2005; 7:00 p.m.		at Drexel	L 66–78	16–11 (10–7)	Daskalakis Athletic Center; Philadelphia, PA
February 26, 2005; 4:00 p.m.		at Hofstra	L 52–75	16–12 (10–8)	Hofstra Arena; Hempstead, NY
CAA tournament
March 5, 2005; 8:30 p.m.		vs. UNC Wilmington; CAA Tournament Quarterfinals	L 47–60	16–13	Richmond Coliseum; Richmond, VA
*Non-conference game. ^{#}Rankings from Coaches' Poll. (#) Tournament seedings in parentheses. All times are in Eastern Time.
