= Kevin Snead =

American football player and sprinter (born 1991)

Profile
- Position: Wide receiver

Personal information
- Born: November 22, 1991 (age 34); Richmond, Virginia, U.S.
- Listed height: 6 ft 0 in (1.83 m)
- Listed weight: 190 lb (86 kg)

Career information
- High school: Richmond (VA) George Wythe High School
- College: Carson-Newman

Career history
- New York Giants (2017)*
- * Offseason or practice squad member only

Kevin Snead
Personal information
- Nationality: United States
- Height: 6 ft 0 in (1.83 m)
- Weight: 190 lb (86 kg)

Sport
- Sport: Track & Field
- Event: Sprint
- College team: Carson-Newman University

Achievements and titles
- Personal bests: 100 m: 10.21 s; 200 m: 20.75 s

Kevin Lamont Snead (born November 22, 1991) is an American football player for the New York Giants and a former All-American sprinter. His college track career includes an SAC championship in the 100 and 200-meter dashes and four All-America honors. The U.S. Track & Field and Cross Country Coaches Association once referred to Snead as the “Fastest Man in College Football.”

== Early life ==
Snead is originally from Richmond, Virginia. He ran track at George Wythe High School before attending Pima and Mesa Community Colleges in Arizona. Snead then transferred to Eastern Michigan University for the 2014-2015 academic year. After his transfer, Snead won a MAC championship.

Snead then attended Carson-Newman University, a Division II program in Jefferson City, Tennessee on a track scholarship. During Snead’s time in the Division II program, he won an SAC championship in the 100 and 200-meter dashes. He won All-America honors on four occasions. In 2016, Snead reached the university’s indoor track record of 6.77 seconds for 60 meters.

In 2016, Snead participated in the Bahamian Olympic Trials. He reached third place in the men's 100 meter run with a 10.44 second time and reached the second-fastest qualifying time for the 200 meter with a 21.03 second time.

While attending Carson-Newman, Snead played wide receiver.

== Professional career ==
During the 2017 Pro Day, Snead’s 40-yard dash was hand-clocked at 4.22 seconds. This matched a combine record set by Cincinnati Bengals wideout Jon Ross.

In 2017, Snead signed a free-agent contract with the New York Giants. After three months, Snead incurred a hamstring tear and the New York Giants released him shortly thereafter.

In April 2018, Snead participated in the Spring League, a three-week professional football league which showcases for the CFL and NFL scouts.

On June 12, 2018, he participated in the New Orleans Saints Minicamp, his first full-team NFL workout following his hamstring injury.

Snead is not currently signed to and NFL team, but sports analyst Lance Zierlein stated that Snead’s speed and leaping ability could win spots as either wide receiver or cornerback.
