= 2006–07 William & Mary Tribe men's basketball team =

American college basketball season

2006–07 William & Mary Tribe men's basketball
- Conference: Colonial Athletic Association
- Record: 15–15 (8–10 CAA)
- Head coach: Tony Shaver (4th season)
- Home arena: Kaplan Arena

2006–07 CAA men's basketball standings
	Conf.				Overall
Team	W		L	PCT	W		L	PCT
VCU†	16	–	2	.889	28	–	7	.800
Old Dominion	15	–	3	.833	24	–	9	.727
Hofstra	13	–	5	.722	23	–	9	.719
Drexel	13	–	5	.722	23	–	9	.719
George Mason	9	–	9	.500	18	–	15	.545
Northeastern	9	–	9	.500	13	–	19	.406
Towson	8	–	10	.444	15	–	17	.469
William & Mary	5	–	13	.278	11	–	20	.355
Georgia State	5	–	13	.278	9	–	21	.300
UNC Wilmington	4	–	14	.222	7	–	22	.241
James Madison	4	–	14	.222	7	–	23	.233
Delaware	3	–	15	.167	5	–	26	.161
† 2007 CAA tournament winner Rankings from AP poll

The 2006–07 William & Mary Tribe men's basketball team represented The College of William & Mary during the 2006–07 college basketball season. This was head coach Tony Shaver's fourth season at William & Mary. The Tribe competed in the Colonial Athletic Association and played their home games at Kaplan Arena. They finished the season 15–15, 8–10 in CAA play and lost in the preliminary round of the 2007 CAA men's basketball tournament to Georgia State. They did not participate in any post-season tournaments.
