= 2004–05 VCU Rams men's basketball team =

American college basketball season

2004–05 VCU Rams men's basketball

NIT, Opening round
- Conference: Colonial Athletic Association
- Record: 19–13 (13–5 CAA)
- Head coach: Jeff Capel III (3rd season)
- Assistant coaches: Gerald White; Jeff LaMere; Mark Cline
- Home arena: Stuart C. Siegel Center

2004–05 CAA men's basketball standings
	Conf.				Overall
Team	W		L	PCT	W		L	PCT
Old Dominion †	15	–	3	.833	28	–	6	.824
UNC Wilmington	13	–	5	.722	19	–	10	.655
VCU	13	–	5	.722	19	–	13	.594
Hofstra	12	–	6	.667	21	–	9	.700
Drexel	12	–	6	.667	17	–	12	.586
George Mason	10	–	8	.556	16	–	13	.552
Delaware	7	–	11	.389	11	–	20	.355
William & Mary	3	–	15	.167	8	–	21	.276
James Madison	3	–	15	.167	6	–	22	.214
Towson	2	–	16	.111	5	–	24	.172
† 2005 CAA tournament winner Rankings from AP poll

The 2004–05 VCU Rams men's basketball team represented Virginia Commonwealth University during the 2004–05 NCAA Division I men's basketball season. It was the 37th season of the university fielding a men's basketball program. Led by third-year head coach Jeff Capel III, they continued to play their home games at the Stuart C. Siegel Center. They were a member of the Colonial Athletic Association. They finished the season 19–13, 13–5 in CAA play to finish in a tie for second place. The Rams defeated Delaware and UNC Wilmington in the CAA Tournament, before losing to Old Dominion in the final. They received an at-large bid to the NIT where they lost in the opening round to Davidson.

== Roster ==
2004–05 VCU Rams men's basketball team
Players
Coaches

Pos.	#	Name	Height	Weight	Year	Hometown
F	1	Dixon Renardo	6 ft 9 in (2.06 m)	210 lb (95 kg)	So	Houston, TX
F	2	Michael Doles	6 ft 6 in (1.98 m)	210 lb (95 kg)	Sr	Richmond, VA
F	4	Mike Anderson	6 ft 7 in (2.01 m)	190 lb (86 kg)	Fr	Virginia Beach, VA
F	5	Julian Capel	6 ft 5 in (1.96 m)	185 lb (84 kg)	Jr	Fayetteville, NC
G	10	Jamal Shuler	6 ft 3 in (1.91 m)	180 lb (82 kg)	Fr	Jacksonville, NC
G	20	B. A. Walker	6 ft 2 in (1.88 m)	160 lb (73 kg)	So	Onancock, VA
F	21	Nick George	6 ft 6 in (1.98 m)	205 lb (93 kg)	So	Manchester, ENG
G	23	Jesse Pellot-Rosa	6 ft 4 in (1.93 m)	195 lb (88 kg)	So	Richmond, VA
G	25	Alex Harper	6 ft 4 in (1.93 m)	190 lb (86 kg)	Jr	Columbia, SC
F	30	Calvin Roland	6 ft 10 in (2.08 m)	245 lb (111 kg)	Jr	Hephzibah, GA
F	31	Eric Davis	6 ft 9 in (2.06 m)	225 lb (102 kg)	Jr	Philadelphia, PA
G	32	Drew Johnson	6 ft 4 in (1.93 m)	200 lb (91 kg)	So	Raleigh, NC
F	34	Derrick Reid	6 ft 8 in (2.03 m)	215 lb (98 kg)	RS Sr	Richmond, VA
F	40	Sam Faulk	6 ft 8 in (2.03 m)	215 lb (98 kg)	Fr	Fayetteville, NC

Head coach

- Jeff Capel III (Duke)

Assistant coach(es)

- Gerald White (Auburn)
- Jeff LaMere (Duke)
- Mark Cline (Wake Forest)

Legend

- (C) Team captain
- (S) Suspended
- (I) Ineligible
- (W) Walk-on
- Injured
- Current redshirt

Roster

== Schedule ==
Date time, TV	Rank^{#}	Opponent^{#}	Result	Record	Site (attendance) city, state
Exhibition
November 10*; 7:00 pm		Virginia Union			Siegel Center; Richmond, VA
Non-conference regular season
November 15*; 7:30 pm		American; NIT Season Tip-Off	W 82–76 ^{OT}	1–0	Siegel Center; Richmond, VA
November 18*; 7:00 pm, CSN-VA		at No. 2 Wake Forest; NIT Season Tip-Off	L 67–81	1–1	Joel Coliseum (13,218); Winston-Salem, NC
November 27*; 7:00 pm		at UAB	L 55–79	1–2	Bartow Arena (5,768); Birmingham, AL
December 1*; 7:30 pm		Hampton	W 83–54	2–2	Siegel Center (4,012); Richmond, VA
December 5; 2:00 pm		UNC Wilmington	L 63–68	2–3 (0–1)	Trask Coliseum (5,155); Wilmington, NC
December 11*; 7:30 pm		Richmond; Black & Blue Classic	W 58–50	3–3	Siegel Center (6,632); Richmond, VA
December 18*; 7:30 pm		La Salle	W 63–52	4–3	Siegel Center (4,872); Richmond, VA
December 22*; 7:30 pm		at Iona	L 72–77	4–4	Hynes Athletic Center (1,441); New Rochelle, NY
December 29*; 7:30 pm		Ole Miss	L 62–63	4–5	Siegel Center (4,312); Richmond, VA
January 2*; 3:00 pm		at Middle Tennessee	L 55–59	4–6	Murphy Center (2,702); Murfreesboro, TN
CAA regular season
January 5; 3:00 pm, WTVR		at George Mason; Rivalry	W 81–74	5–6 (1–1)	Patriot Center (2,527); Fairfax, VA
January 7; 3:00 pm, WTVR		at Towson	W 70–58	6–6 (2–1)	Towson Center (1,317); Towson, MD
January 12; 7:30 pm		Drexel	L 64–66	6–7 (2–2)	Siegel Center (3,878); Richmond, VA
January 15; 4:00 pm		Hofstra	W 70–58	7–7 (3–2)	Siegel Center (5,034); Richmond, VA
January 19; 4:00 pm		at Delaware	W 66–57	8–7 (4–2)	Bob Carpenter Center (4,139); Newark, DE
January 22; 7:00 pm		at William & Mary	W 79–77 ^{OT}	9–7 (5–2)	Kaplan Arena (1,680); Williamsburg, VA
January 26; 7:30 pm		at James Madison	L 58–66	9–8 (5–3)	Siegel Center (4,898); Richmond, VA
January 29; 4:00 pm		Old Dominion; Rivalry	W 75–71	10–8 (6–3)	Siegel Center (7,080); Richmond, VA
January 31; 7:00 pm		at James Madison	W 70–43	11–8 (7–3)	JMU Convocation Center (3,444); Harrisonburg, VA
February 2; 7:00 pm		at Hofstra	L 58–60	11–9 (7–4)	Hofstra Arena (1,507); Hempstead, NY
February 5		Towson	W 84–61	12–9 (8–4)	Siegel Center (6,986); Richmond, VA
February 9		at Drexel	W 62–59	13–9 (9–4)	Siegel Center (1,605); Richmond, VA
February 12		at Old Dominion; Rivalry	L 76–82	13–10 (9–5)	Ted Constant Center (8,438); Norfolk, VA
February 14		George Mason; Rivalry	W 89–81	14–10 (10–5)	Siegel Center (3,095); Richmond, VA
February 16		Delaware	W 83–73	15–10 (11–5)	Siegel Center (3,671); Richmond, VA
February 19*; 6:00 pm, ESPNU		at Charleston; ESPN BracketBusters	L 75–85	15–11	John Kresse Arena (3,277); Charleston, SC
February 23; 7:30 pm		William & Mary	W 91–69	16–11 (12–5)	Siegel Center (4,737); Richmond, VA
February 26; 7:30 pm		at UNC Wilmington	W 72–71 ^{OT}	17–11 (13–5)	Siegel Center (7,283); Richmond, VA
CAA tournament
March 5; 6:00 pm	(2)	vs. (7) Delaware; Quarterfinals	W 74–61	18–11	Richmond Coliseum; Richmond, VA
March 6; 6:00 pm	(2)	vs. (3) UNC Wilmington; Semifinals	W 55–46	19–11	Richmond Coliseum (7,177); Richmond, VA
March 7; 7:00 pm	(2)	vs. (1) Old Dominion; Championship	L 66–73 ^{OT}	19–12	Richmond Coliseum (10,620); Richmond, VA
NIT
March 16; 7:30 pm		Davidson; Opening round	L 62–77	19–13	Siegel Center (2,862); Richmond, VA
