= 2006–07 Drexel Dragons men's basketball team =

American college basketball season

2006–07 Drexel Dragons men's basketball

NIT tournament first round, L 56–63
- Conference: Colonial Athletic Association
- Record: 23–9 (13–5 CAA)
- Head coach: Bruiser Flint (6th season)
- Assistant coaches: Geoff Arnold (6th season); Mike Connors (6th season); Tony Chiles (3rd season)
- Home arena: Daskalakis Athletic Center

2006–07 CAA men's basketball standings
| | Conf. | | | | Overall |
| Team | W | | L | PCT | W | | L | PCT |
|---|---|---|---|---|---|---|---|---|
| VCU† | 16 | – | 2 | .889 | 28 | – | 7 | .800 |
| Old Dominion | 15 | – | 3 | .833 | 24 | – | 9 | .727 |
| Hofstra | 13 | – | 5 | .722 | 23 | – | 9 | .719 |
| Drexel | 13 | – | 5 | .722 | 23 | – | 9 | .719 |
| George Mason | 9 | – | 9 | .500 | 18 | – | 15 | .545 |
| Northeastern | 9 | – | 9 | .500 | 13 | – | 19 | .406 |
| Towson | 8 | – | 10 | .444 | 15 | – | 17 | .469 |
| William & Mary | 5 | – | 13 | .278 | 11 | – | 20 | .355 |
| Georgia State | 5 | – | 13 | .278 | 9 | – | 21 | .300 |
| UNC Wilmington | 4 | – | 14 | .222 | 7 | – | 22 | .241 |
| James Madison | 4 | – | 14 | .222 | 7 | – | 23 | .233 |
| Delaware | 3 | – | 15 | .167 | 5 | – | 26 | .161 |
† 2007 CAA tournament winner Rankings from AP poll

The 2006–07 Drexel Dragons men's basketball team represented Drexel University during the 2006–07 NCAA Division I men's basketball season. The Dragons, led by 6th year head coach Bruiser Flint, played their home games at the Daskalakis Athletic Center and were members of the Colonial Athletic Association.

== Roster ==
2006–07 Drexel Dragons men's basketball team
Players
Coaches

| Pos. | # | Name | Height | Weight | Year | Previous school | Hometown |
|---|---|---|---|---|---|---|---|
| G | 0 | Tramayne Hawthorne | 6 ft 0 in (1.83 m) | 180 lb (82 kg) | So | Steelton-Highspire | Steelton, PA |
| G | 1 | Bobby Jordan | 6 ft 0 in (1.83 m) | 180 lb (82 kg) | So | Roman Catholic HS | Philadelphia, PA |
| G | 3 | Scott Rodgers | 6 ft 3 in (1.91 m) | 200 lb (91 kg) | So | Central HS | Philadelphia, PA |
| G | 5 | Bashir Mason | 6 ft 0 in (1.83 m) | 185 lb (84 kg) | Sr | St. Benedict's | Jersey City, NJ |
| G | 12 | Rob Hampton | 6 ft 4 in (1.93 m) | 200 lb (91 kg) | Fr | Christ the King HS | Queens, NY |
| F | 13 | Yannick Formbor | 6 ft 8 in (2.03 m) | 255 lb (116 kg) | Fr | St. Patrick's | Roselle, NJ |
| G | 14 | Bill Lally | 6 ft 0 in (1.83 m) | 170 lb (77 kg) | Fr | Roman Catholic HS | Philadelphia, PA |
| G | 15 | Frank Elegar | 6 ft 9 in (2.06 m) | 225 lb (102 kg) | Jr | Hargrave Military Academy | Bronx, NY |
| F | 20 | Chaz Crawford | 6 ft 10 in (2.08 m) | 235 lb (107 kg) | Sr | St. Raymond's | Philadelphia, PA |
| G | 21 | Jake Rauchbach (W) | 5 ft 11 in (1.8 m) | 170 lb (77 kg) | Sr | Pendleton School | Chapel Hill, NC |
| G | 23 | Dominick Mejia | 6 ft 5 in (1.96 m) | 200 lb (91 kg) | Sr | NC State | Voorhees, NJ |
| F | 25 | Randy Oveneke | 6 ft 7 in (2.01 m) | 225 lb (102 kg) | Jr | Saint Anna College | Antwerpen, Belgium |
| F | 33 | Evan Neisler (I) (redshirt) | 6 ft 8 in (2.03 m) | 215 lb (98 kg) | So | Boston College | Raleigh, NC |
| G | 34 | Lance Feurtado | 6 ft 5 in (1.96 m) | 190 lb (86 kg) | Fr | Uniondale HS | Uniondale, NY |
| F | 42 | Kenny Tribbett | 6 ft 9 in (2.06 m) | 250 lb (113 kg) | RS Fr | Chester (Pa.) | Berlin, NJ |
| F | 44 | Matt Stevenson | 6 ft 7 in (2.01 m) | 235 lb (107 kg) | Sr | Loch Raven HS | Towson, MD |

Head coach

- James "Bruiser" Flint (Saint Joseph's)

Assistant coach(es)

- Geoff Arnold (Saint Joseph's)
- Mike Connors (Ithaca)
- Tony Chiles (Columbia)

Legend

- (C) Team captain
- (S) Suspended
- (I) Ineligible
- (W) Walk-on
- Injured
- Current redshirt

Roster

== Schedule ==
| Date time, TV | Rank^{#} | Opponent^{#} | Result | Record | High points | High rebounds | High assists | Site (attendance) city, state |
Regular season
| November 15, 2006*; 7:30 pm | | Florida Gulf Coast | W 73–37 | 1–0 | 16 – Tied | 11 – Crawford | 3 – Tied | Daskalakis Athletic Center (1,527); Philadelphia, PA |
| November 18, 2006*; 2:00 pm | | at Vermont | W 67–59 | 2–0 | 10 – Hawthorne | 7 – Crawford | 4 – Mason | Patrick Gym (2,926); Burlington, VT |
| November 21, 2006*; 8:00 pm, CN8 | | at Penn; Battle of 33rd Street | L 49–68 | 2–1 | 10 – Mejia | 8 – Crawford | 6 – Mason | Palestra (5,268); Philadelphia, PA |
| November 27, 2006*; 7:30 pm | | at Rider | L 81–89 ^{OT} | 2–2 | 26 – Mason | 9 – Elegar | 4 – Mason | Alumni Gymnasium (Rider) (1,528); Lawrenceville, NJ |
| November 29, 2006*; 7:30 pm | | Toledo | W 57–52 | 3–2 | 15 – Elegar | 10 – Crawford | 3 – Tied | Daskalakis Athletic Center (1,629); Philadelphia, PA |
| December 2, 2006*; 2:00 pm | | vs. Saint Joseph's | W 72–56 | 4–2 | 23 – Elegar | 13 – Elegar | 4 – Mason | Palestra (7,622); Philadelphia, PA |
| December 5, 2006*; 7:30 pm | | Fairleigh Dickinson | W 80–58 | 5–2 | 23 – Elegar | 13 – Crawford | 5 – Mason | Daskalakis Athletic Center (1,642); Philadelphia, PA |
| December 9, 2006*; 7:30 pm | | at No. RV Villanova | W 81–76 | 6–2 | 21 – Mason | 11 – Elegar | 5 – Rodgers | The Pavilion (6,500); Villanova, PA |
| December 19, 2006*; 7:00 pm | | at No. 23 Syracuse | W 84–79 | 7–2 | 27 – Elegar | 10 – Elegar | 5 – Mason | Carrier Dome (16,328); Syracuse, NY |
| December 22, 2006*; 7:00 pm | | at Temple | W 69–54 | 8–2 | 13 – Tied | 8 – Oveneke | 3 – Tied | Liacouras Center (4,677); Philadelphia, PA |
CAA Regular Season
| December 28, 2006; 7:00 pm, CN8 | No. RV | George Mason | W 61–49 | 9–2 (1–0) | 20 – Mejia | 14 – Crawford | 5 – Mason | Daskalakis Athletic Center (2,506); Philadelphia, PA |
| January 3, 2007; 12:00 pm | No. RV | at Georgia State | W 61–55 | 10–2 (2–0) | 17 – Crawford | 13 – Crawford | 2 – Tied | GSU Sports Arena (1,011); Atlanta, GA |
| January 6, 2007; 4:00 pm | No. RV | UNC Wilmington | W 69–55 | 11–2 (3–0) | 20 – Elegar | 15 – Crawford | 3 – Rodgers | Daskalakis Athletic Center (2,361); Philadelphia, PA |
| January 8, 2007; 7:00 pm, CN8 | No. RV | at James Madison | W 65–54 | 12–2 (4–0) | 17 – Mason | 14 – Crawford | 3 – Mejia | JMU Convocation Center (3,129); Harrisonburg, VA |
| January 11, 2007; 8:00 pm, CN8 | No. RV | Hofstra | L 53–55 ^{OT} | 12–3 (4–1) | 21 – Mejia | 11 – Crawford | 4 – Mason | Daskalakis Athletic Center (2,502); Philadelphia, PA |
| January 13, 2007; 4:00 pm, CSN | No. RV | Old Dominion | L 57–84 | 12–4 (4–2) | 13 – Rodgers | 9 – Mejia | 4 – Rodgers | Ted Constant Convocation Center (7,092); Norfolk, VA |
| January 17, 2007; 7:30 pm | | Northeastern | W 67–41 | 13–4 (5–2) | 16 – Tied | 11 – Crawford | 4 – Mason | Daskalakis Athletic Center (2,102); Philadelphia, PA |
| January 20, 2007; 12:00 pm, CN8 | | at Delaware | W 69–61 | 14–4 (6–2) | 19 – Elegar | 11 – Crawford | 2 – Tied | Bob Carpenter Center (3,761); Newark, DE |
| January 24, 2007; 7:00 pm | | at UNC Wilmington | W 66–50 | 15–4 (7–2) | 17 – Elegar | 6 – Mejia | 3 – Mason | Trask Coliseum (5,282); Wilmington, NC |
| January 27, 2007; 12:00 pm, CN8 | | No. RV Virginia Commonwealth | L 68–75 | 15–5 (7–3) | 19 – Mason | 7 – Crawford | 4 – Tied | Daskalakis Athletic Center (2,511); Philadelphia, PA |
| January 29, 2007; 7:00 pm | | at Northeastern | W 68–59 | 16–5 (8–3) | 16 – Elegar | 8 – Elegar | 4 – Mason | Cabot Center (1,522); Boston, MA |
| February 1, 2007; 7:00 pm, ESPNU | | Old Dominion | L 52–62 | 16–6 (8–4) | 16 – Elegar | 13 – Crawford | 5 – Rodgers | Daskalakis Athletic Center (2,103); Philadelphia, PA |
| February 3, 2007; 4:00 pm, CSN | | Towson | W 66–56 | 17–6 (9–4) | 21 – Elegar | 9 – Elegar | 4 – Mason | Daskalakis Athletic Center (2,247); Philadelphia, PA |
| February 8, 2007; 7:00 pm, CN8 | | at Hofstra | W 95–87 ^{OT} | 18–6 (10–4) | 26 – Elegar | 8 – Tied | 5 – Rodgers | Mack Sports Complex (3,715); Hempstead, NY |
| February 10, 2007; 4:00 pm | | Delaware | W 77–62 | 9–15 (2–10) | 21 – Rodgers | 10 – Crawford | 8 – Mason | Daskalakis Athletic Center (2,357); Philadelphia, PA |
| February 14, 2007; 7:00 pm | | at William & Mary | L 47–60 | 19–7 (11–5) | 18 – Elegar | 9 – Tied | 3 – Crawford | Kaplan Arena (2,011); Williamsburg, VA |
| February 17, 2007*; 10:00 pm, ESPN2 | | at No. RV Creighton | W 64–58 | 20–7 (12–4) | 20 – Mejia | 8 – Tied | 5 – Mason | CenturyLink Center (17,607); Omaha, NE |
| February 21, 2007; 7:30 pm | No. RV | William & Mary | W 64–57 | 21–7 (12–5) | 16 – Mejia | 14 – Crawford | 5 – Mason | Daskalakis Athletic Center (2,063); Philadelphia, PA |
| February 24, 2007; 12:00 pm, CN8 | No. RV | at Towson | W 77–68 | 22–7 (13–5) | 18 – Mejia | 13 – Crawford | 4 – Rodgers | Towson Center (2,446); Towson, MD |
CAA tournament
| March 3, 2007; 2:30 pm, CN8 | (4) | vs. (5) Northeastern; Quarterfinals | W 64–50 | 23–7 | 23 – Elegar | 6 – Tied | 2 – Tied | Richmond Coliseum (6,242); Richmond, VA |
| March 4, 2007; 3:00 pm, CN8 | (4) | vs. (1) No. RV Virginia Commonwealth; Semifinals | L 56–63 | 23–8 | 15 – Elegar | 8 – Elegar | 7 – Rodgers | Richmond Coliseum (11,200); Richmond, VA |
NIT
| March 13, 2007*; 8:00 pm, ESPNU | (3) | (6) NC State; First Round | L 56–63 | 23–9 | 24 – Elegar | 9 – Crawford | 5 – Tied | Daskalakis Athletic Center (2,499); Philadelphia, PA |
*Non-conference game. ^{#}Rankings from AP. (#) Tournament seedings in parentheses. All times are in Eastern Time.

== Rankings ==
Ranking movement Legend: ██ Increase in ranking. ██ Decrease in ranking. ██ Not ranked the previous week. RV=Others receiving votes.
| Poll | Pre | Wk 2 | Wk 3 | Wk 4 | Wk 5 | Wk 6 | Wk 7 | Wk 8 | Wk 9 | Wk 10 | Wk 11 | Wk 12 | Wk 13 | Wk 14 | Wk 15 | Wk 16 | Wk 17 | Post | Final |
|---|---|---|---|---|---|---|---|---|---|---|---|---|---|---|---|---|---|---|---|
| AP | | | | | | | | RV | RV | RV | | | | | | RV | | | N/A |
| Coaches | | | | | | | | | RV | RV | | | | | | | | | |

== Awards ==
Chaz Crawford

- CAA Defensive Player of the Year
- CAA All-Defensive Team
- CAA Player of the Week

Frank Elegar

- CAA All-Conference Second Team
- CAA All-Tournament Team
- CAA Player of the Week (3)

Bashir Mason

- CAA All-Conference Third Team
- CAA All-Defensive Team
- CAA Player of the Week

Scott Rodgers

- CAA All-Academic Second Team
