= 2004–05 William & Mary Tribe men's basketball team =

American college basketball season

2004–05 William & Mary Tribe men's basketball
- Conference: Colonial Athletic Association
- Record: 8–21 (3–15 CAA)
- Head coach: Tony Shaver (2nd season)
- Home arena: Kaplan Arena

2004–05 CAA men's basketball standings
	Conf.				Overall
Team	W		L	PCT	W		L	PCT
Old Dominion †	15	–	3	.833	28	–	6	.824
UNC Wilmington	13	–	5	.722	19	–	10	.655
VCU	13	–	5	.722	19	–	13	.594
Hofstra	12	–	6	.667	21	–	9	.700
Drexel	12	–	6	.667	17	–	12	.586
George Mason	10	–	8	.556	16	–	13	.552
Delaware	7	–	11	.389	11	–	20	.355
William & Mary	3	–	15	.167	8	–	21	.276
James Madison	3	–	15	.167	6	–	22	.214
Towson	2	–	16	.111	5	–	24	.172
† 2005 CAA tournament winner Rankings from AP poll

The 2004–05 William & Mary Tribe men's basketball team represented The College of William & Mary during the 2004–05 college basketball season. This was head coach Tony Shaver's second season at William & Mary. The Tribe competed in the Colonial Athletic Association and played their home games at Kaplan Arena. They finished the season 8–21, 3–15 in CAA play and lost in the quarterfinals of the 2005 CAA men's basketball tournament to rivals Old Dominion after defeating James Madison in the preliminary round. They did not participate in any post-season tournaments.
