= 2004–05 Drexel Dragons men's basketball team =

American college basketball season

2004–05 Drexel Dragons men's basketball

NIT tournament Opening Round, L 76–81
- Conference: Colonial Athletic Association
- Record: 17–12 (12–6 CAA)
- Head coach: Bruiser Flint (4th season)
- Assistant coaches: Geoff Arnold (4th season); Mike Connors (4th season); Tony Chiles (1st season)
- Home arena: Daskalakis Athletic Center

2004–05 CAA men's basketball standings
	Conf.				Overall
Team	W		L	PCT	W		L	PCT
Old Dominion †	15	–	3	.833	28	–	6	.824
UNC Wilmington	13	–	5	.722	19	–	10	.655
VCU	13	–	5	.722	19	–	13	.594
Hofstra	12	–	6	.667	21	–	9	.700
Drexel	12	–	6	.667	17	–	12	.586
George Mason	10	–	8	.556	16	–	13	.552
Delaware	7	–	11	.389	11	–	20	.355
William & Mary	3	–	15	.167	8	–	21	.276
James Madison	3	–	15	.167	6	–	22	.214
Towson	2	–	16	.111	5	–	24	.172
† 2005 CAA tournament winner Rankings from AP poll

The 2004–05 Drexel Dragons men's basketball team represented Drexel University during the 2004–05 NCAA Division I men's basketball season. The Dragons, led by 4th year head coach Bruiser Flint, played their home games at the Daskalakis Athletic Center and were members of the Colonial Athletic Association.

== Roster ==
2004–05 Drexel Dragons men's basketball team
Players
Coaches

Pos.	#	Name	Height	Weight	Year	Previous school	Hometown
G/F	1	Kenell Sanchez	6 ft 5 in (1.96 m)	220 lb (100 kg)	Jr	Bishop Eustace	Camden, NJ
G	3	Jake Rauchbach (W)	5 ft 11 in (1.8 m)	170 lb (77 kg)	So	Pendleton School	Chapel Hill, NC
F	4	Sean Brooks	6 ft 6 in (1.98 m)	250 lb (113 kg)	Sr	Central HS (MD)	Bladensburg, MD
G	5	Bashir Mason	6 ft 0 in (1.83 m)	180 lb (82 kg)	So	St. Benedict's	Jersey City, NJ
F	12	Rob Hampton	6 ft 4 in (1.93 m)	196 lb (89 kg)	Fr	Christ the King HS	Queens, NY
G	15	Frank Elegar	6 ft 8 in (2.03 m)	190 lb (86 kg)	Fr	Hargrave Military Academy	Bronx, NY
F	20	Chaz Crawford	6 ft 10 in (2.08 m)	220 lb (100 kg)	So	St. Raymond's	Philadelphia, PA
G/F	21	Danny Hinds	6 ft 6 in (1.98 m)	220 lb (100 kg)	Sr	Allentown Central Catholic HS	Allentown, PA
F	22	Tim Tillman	6 ft 8 in (2.03 m)	220 lb (100 kg)	Jr	Virginia Episcopal	Philadelphia, PA
G	23	Dominick Mejia	6 ft 4 in (1.93 m)	200 lb (91 kg)	So	NC State	Voorhees, NJ
F	25	Randy Oveneke	6 ft 7 in (2.01 m)	200 lb (91 kg)	Fr	Saint Anna College	Antwerpen, Belgium
G	32	Phil Goss	6 ft 2 in (1.88 m)	185 lb (84 kg)	Sr	Oxon Hill HS	Temple Hills, MD
G	34	Jeremiah King	6 ft 2 in (1.88 m)	190 lb (86 kg)	Sr	Philadelphia Christian	Passaic, NJ
F	44	Matt Stevenson	6 ft 7 in (2.01 m)	215 lb (98 kg)	So	Loch Raven HS	Towson, MD

Head coach

- James "Bruiser" Flint (Saint Joseph's)

Assistant coach(es)

- Geoff Arnold (Saint Joseph's)
- Mike Connors (Ithaca)
- Tony Chiles (Columbia)

Legend

- (C) Team captain
- (S) Suspended
- (I) Ineligible
- (W) Walk-on
- Injured
- Current redshirt

Roster

== Schedule ==
Date time, TV	Rank^{#}	Opponent^{#}	Result	Record	High points	High rebounds	High assists	Site (attendance) city, state
Regular season
November 23, 2004*; 8:00 pm		at Penn; Battle of 33rd Street	L 50–81	0–1	13 – Brooks	5 – Tied	2 – Tied	Palestra (4,133); Philadelphia, PA
November 27, 2004*; 3:00 pm		at Rider	L 71–76	0–2	15 – Tied	8 – Goss	–	Alumni Gymnasium (1,325); Lawrenceville, NJ
November 30, 2004*; 7:00 pm		at Lafayette	W 78–67	1–2	26 – Goss	7 – Crawford	5 – Hinds	Kirby Sports Center (1,852); Easton, PA
December 4, 2004*; 8:00 pm		vs. Saint Joseph's; Big 5 Classic	W 57–49	2–2	15 – Goss	9 – Crawford	3 – Mason	Palestra (6,743); Philadelphia, PA
December 8, 2004; 7:30 pm		at Delaware	L 65–67	2–3 (0–1)	16 – Hinds	8 – Crawford	3 – Tied	Bob Carpenter Center (4,190); Newark, DE
December 11, 2004*; 3:00 pm		Quinnipiac	W 66–59	3–3	14 – Tied	10 – Crawford	5 – Hinds	Daskalakis Athletic Center (1,638); Philadelphia, PA
December 18, 2004*; 7:00 pm		at No. 8 Syracuse	L 54–74	3–4	15 – Crawford	5 – Crawford	6 – Mason	Carrier Dome (16,840); Syracuse, NY
December 21, 2004*; 7:30 pm		at Seton Hall	L 54–58	3–5	19 – Crawford	11 – Crawford	3 – Mason	IZOD Center (6,185); East Rutherford, NJ
December 28, 2004*; 7:00 pm		Monmouth	W 76–47	4–5	23 – Mejia	6 – Tied	5 – King	Daskalakis Athletic Center (1,310); Philadelphia, PA
CAA Regular Season
January 5, 2005; 7:00 pm		No. RV Old Dominion	L 59–60	4–6 (0–2)	13 – Goss	7 – Hinds	3 – Tied	Daskalakis Athletic Center (2,038); Philadelphia, PA
January 8, 2005; 4:00 pm		No. RV Hofstra	W 84–81 ^{OT}	5–6 (1–2)	22 – Mejia	8 – Crawford	7 – King	Mack Sports Complex (2,513); Hempstead, NY
January 12, 2005; 7:30 pm		at Virginia Commonwealth	W 66–64	6–6 (2–2)	21 – Brooks	6 – Brooks	3 – Mason	Siegel Center (3,878); Richmond, VA
January 15, 2005; 4:00 pm		William & Mary	W 91–65	7–6 (3–2)	21 – Goss	6 – Tied	5 – Goss	Daskalakis Athletic Center (2,198); Philadelphia, PA
January 19, 2005; 7:00 pm		at George Mason	W 66–59	8–6 (4–2)	23 – Mejia	14 – Crawford	5 – Mason	EagleBank Arena (2,409); Fairfax, VA
January 22, 2005; 2:00 pm		Towson	W 76–55	9–6 (5–2)	21 – Goss	5 – Tied	4 – Tied	Daskalakis Athletic Center (1,025); Philadelphia, PA
January 26, 2005; 7:00 pm		at UNC Wilmington	L 62–63 ^{OT}	9–7 (5–3)	13 – King	14 – Crawford	3 – Goss	Trask Coliseum (5,915); Wilmington, NC
January 29, 2005; 4:00 pm		James Madison	W 88–60	10–7 (6–3)	22 – King	7 – Brooks	6 – Tied	Daskalakis Athletic Center (2,053); Philadelphia, PA
January 31, 2005; 7:00 pm		at No. RV Old Dominion	L 76–82	10–8 (6–4)	18 – Brooks	7 – Brooks	5 – Goss	Ted Constant Convocation Center (5,143); Norfolk, VA
February 2, 2005; 7:00 pm		at William & Mary	W 60–48	11–8 (7–4)	18 – Brooks	11 – Brooks	4 – Mason	Kaplan Arena (1,603); Williamsburg, VA
February 5, 2005; 8:00 pm		Hofstra	W 70–52	12–8 (8–4)	16 – Goss	10 – Crawford	3 – Tied	Daskalakis Athletic Center (2,105); Philadelphia, PA
February 9, 2005; 7:00 pm		Virginia Commonwealth	L 59–62	12–9 (8–5)	24 – Goss	6 – Tied	6 – Mason	Daskalakis Athletic Center (1,605); Philadelphia, PA
February 12, 2005; 2:00 pm		at James Madison	W 75–66	13–9 (9–5)	19 – Goss	10 – Crawford	3 – Tied	JMU Convocation Center (3,269); Harrisonburg, VA
February 14, 2005; 7:00 pm		UNC Wilmington	L 66–69	13–10 (9–6)	16 – Goss	8 – Tied	4 – Brooks	Daskalakis Athletic Center (1,685); Philadelphia, PA
February 19, 2005*; 5:00 pm		at Ball State	W 74–70	14–10	26 – Goss	10 – Brooks	5 – Brooks	Worthen Arena (6,641); Muncie, IN
February 23, 2005; 7:00 pm		George Mason	W 78–66	15–10 (10–6)	19 – King	13 – Crawford	10 – Mason	Daskalakis Athletic Center (2,089); Philadelphia, PA
February 26, 2005; 2:00 pm		Delaware	W 86–80	16–10 (11–6)	22 – Mason	13 – Brooks	5 – Brooks	Daskalakis Athletic Center (2,339); Philadelphia, PA
February 28, 2005; 7:00 pm		at Towson	W 66–60	17–10 (12–6)	17 – Sanchez	10 – Crawford	6 – Mason	Towson Center (627); Towson, MD
CAA tournament
March 5, 2005; 2:30 pm	(4)	vs. (5) Hofstra; Quarterfinals	L 77–89	17–11	18 – Goss	8 – King	5 – Mason	Richmond Coliseum (4,232); Richmond, VA
National Invitation Tournament
March 16, 2005; 8:00 pm		at Buffalo; Opening Round	L 76–81 ^{OT}	17–12	25 – King	10 – Crawford	3 – King	Alumni Arena (4,012); Buffalo, NY
*Non-conference game. ^{#}Rankings from AP. (#) Tournament seedings in parentheses. All times are in Eastern Time.

== Awards ==
Chaz Crawford

- CAA All-Defensive Team

Phil Goss

- CAA All-Conference Second Team
- CAA Player of the Week

Bashir Mason

- CAA All-Defensive Team
- CAA Player of the Week
