= 2006–07 George Mason Patriots men's basketball team =

American college basketball season

2006–07 George Mason Patriots men's basketball
- Conference: Colonial Athletic Association
- Record: 18–15 (9–9 CAA)
- Head coach: Jim Larranaga
- Assistant coaches: Scott Cherry; James Johnson; Chris Caputo
- Home arena: Patriot Center

2006–07 CAA men's basketball standings
	Conf.				Overall
Team	W		L	PCT	W		L	PCT
VCU†	16	–	2	.889	28	–	7	.800
Old Dominion	15	–	3	.833	24	–	9	.727
Hofstra	13	–	5	.722	23	–	9	.719
Drexel	13	–	5	.722	23	–	9	.719
George Mason	9	–	9	.500	18	–	15	.545
Northeastern	9	–	9	.500	13	–	19	.406
Towson	8	–	10	.444	15	–	17	.469
William & Mary	5	–	13	.278	11	–	20	.355
Georgia State	5	–	13	.278	9	–	21	.300
UNC Wilmington	4	–	14	.222	7	–	22	.241
James Madison	4	–	14	.222	7	–	23	.233
Delaware	3	–	15	.167	5	–	26	.161
† 2007 CAA tournament winner Rankings from AP poll

The 2006–07 George Mason Patriots men's basketball team began their 41st season of collegiate play on November 11, 2006 at Cleveland State. This season followed their historic 2005–06 season where they advanced to the Final Four of the 2006 NCAA Men's Division I Basketball Tournament. However, the 2006–07 team was much less successful; they finishing with an 18-15 record and were not invited to any post-season tournaments.

== Season notes ==
- After playing in the first 2 games, Sammy Hernandez requested a transfer from the team. He enrolled at Florida Atlantic University.

== Awards ==
Second Team All-CAA

- Will Thomas

Third Team All-CAA

- Folarin Campbell

CAA All-Defensive Team

- Will Thomas

CAA Player of the Week

- Will Thomas – Nov. 13
- Jordan Carter – Jan. 15

CAA Rookie of the Week

- Louis Birdsong – Dec. 26

== Roster ==
2006–07 George Mason Patriots men's basketball team
Players
Coaches

Pos.	#	Name	Height	Weight	Year	Previous school	Hometown
F	33	Louis Birdsong	6 ft 6 in (1.98 m)	230 lb (104 kg)	Fr	Mount Saint Joseph’s	Baltimore, MD
G	12	Tim Burns	6 ft 3 in (1.91 m)	185 lb (84 kg)	Sr	Worcester Academy	Greenfield, MA
G	42	Folarin Campbell	6 ft 4 in (1.93 m)	205 lb (93 kg)	Jr	Springbrook	Silver Spring, MD
G	2	Jordan Carter	6 ft 0 in (1.83 m)	175 lb (79 kg)	Jr	Brebeuf	Indianapolis, IN
F	40	Chris Fleming	6 ft 7 in (2.01 m)	240 lb (109 kg)	So	Osbourn Park	Manassas, VA
F	3	Makan Konate	6 ft 7 in (2.01 m)	215 lb (98 kg)	Sr	Worcester Academy	Mali
G	24	Charles Makings	6 ft 2 in (1.88 m)	210 lb (95 kg)	Sr	St. John's College	Silver Spring, MD
F	32	Darryl Monroe	6 ft 7 in (2.01 m)	275 lb (125 kg)	Jr	First Colonial	Virginia Beach, VA
F	5	Gabe Norwood	6 ft 5 in (1.96 m)	190 lb (86 kg)	Sr	State College	State College, PA
G	1	Dre Smith	6 ft 0 in (1.83 m)	185 lb (84 kg)	So	Lamar	Houston, TX
F	34	Will Thomas	6 ft 7 in (2.01 m)	230 lb (104 kg)	Jr	Mount Saint Joseph’s	Baltimore, MD
F	13	Jesus Urbina	6 ft 7 in (2.01 m)	235 lb (107 kg)	RS Jr	Amelia Academy	Venezuela
G	23	John Vaughn	6 ft 3 in (1.91 m)	179 lb (81 kg)	RS So	Laurel	Laurel, MD

Head coach

- Jim Larranaga (Providence)

Assistant coach(es)

- Scott Cherry (North Carolina)
- James Johnson (Ferrum)
- Chris Caputo (Westfield)

Legend

- (C) Team captain
- (S) Suspended
- (I) Ineligible
- (W) Walk-on
- Injured
- Current redshirt

Roster
Last update: 2010-07-27

== Stats ==
Player	GP	GS	MPG	FG%	3FG%	FT%	RPG	APG	SPG	BPG	PPG
Folarin Campbell	32	32	32.7	.376	.307	.722	3.9	3.8	1.3	.3	13.9
Will Thomas	33	33	34.8	.627	.000	.622	6.9	2.2	.6	.6	13.3
John Vaughan	32	13	23.3	.397	.311	.655	2.8	1.1	.6	.0	8.3
Dre Smith	32	18	22.6	.410	.391	.593	2.2	1.3	.8	.1	8.0
Darryl Monroe	33	19	20.9	.563	.000	.471	3.9	1.1	.5	.6	6.1
Jordan Carter	33	24	23.1	.483	.460	.676	2.9	2.2	1.0	.2	5.0
Gabe Norwood	33	9	18.7	.465	.382	.706	2.1	1.8	.7	.2	3.6
Louis Birdsong	30	5	13.6	.488	.000	.762	2.9	.6	.2	.4	3.3
Tim Burns	18	2	6.9	.353	.346	.333	.4	.2	.1	.1	1.9
Chris Fleming	19	3	7.0	.542	.000	.500	.8	.1	.1	.1	1.5
Charles Makings	7	0	2.7	1.000	.000	.500	1.0	.1	.0	.0	1.3
Jesus Urbina	21	6	8.8	.324	.100	.200	2.5	.1	.2	.2	1.1
Sammy Hernandez	2	0	4.5	.500	.000	.000	1.5	.5	.0	.0	1.0
Makan Konate	9	1	2.1	.143	.000	.000	.3	.1	.0	.0	.2

== Game log ==
Date time, TV	Rank^{#}	Opponent^{#}	Result	Record	High points	High rebounds	High assists	Site (attendance) city, state
Non-conference regular season
November 11, 2006*; 3:00 pm		at Cleveland State	W 79–74	1–0	25 – Thomas	10 – Thomas	5 – Norwood, Thomas	Wolstein Center (3,004); Cleveland, OH
November 18, 2006*; 4:00 pm, ESPN2		Wichita State; Final Four Banner Unveiling	L 66–72	1–1	21 – Vaughan	10 – Thomas	4 – Thomas	Patriot Center (9,804); Fairfax, VA
November 21, 2006*; 7:00 pm		at Hampton	W 55–46	2–1	22 – Campbell	7 – Thomas	3 – Campbell, Monroe	Convocation Center (1,992); Hampton, VA
November 25, 2006*; 2:00 pm		at Creighton	L 56–58	2–2	22 – Vaughan	10 – Urbina	4 – Campbell	Qwest Center Omaha (15,445); Omaha, NE
November 27, 2006*; 7:00 pm		Florida International	W 65–39	3–2	20 – Smith	8 – Monroe	4 – Campbell	Patriot Center (4,310); Fairfax, VA
December 3, 2006*; 1:30 pm, Comcast		vs. Bucknell; BB&T Classic	L 57–60	3–3	20 – Campbell	7 – Urbina	4 – Thomas	Verizon Center (16,924); Washington, D.C.
December 6, 2006*; 7:00 pm		at Radford	W 62–60	4–3	21 – Campbell	10 – Thomas	6 – Campbell	Dedmon Center (3,123); Radford, VA
December 9, 2006*; 12:00 pm, ESPN		at No. 7 Duke	L 53–69	4–4	13 – Campbell, Thomas	6 – Vaughan	6 – Campbell	Cameron Indoor (9,314); Durham, NC
December 21, 2006*; 7:00 pm		at Holy Cross	W 58–46	5–4	18 – Campbell	11 – Birdsong	3 – Campbell	DCU Center (3,114); Worcester, MA
CAA regular season
December 28, 2006; 7:00 pm, CN8		at Drexel	L 49–61	5–5 (0–1)	19 – Thomas	8 – Thomas	2 – Campbell	Daskalakis Athletic Center (2,506); Philadelphia, PA
December 30, 2006*; 12:00 pm, Comcast		Mississippi State	L 59–63	6–5	22 – Thomas	9 – Thomas	3 – Norwood	Patriot Center (7,846); Fairfax, VA
January 3, 2007; 7:00 pm		William & Mary	L 63–67	6–6 (0–2)	20 – Thomas	5 – Campbell	5 – Norwood	Patriot Center (4,409); Fairfax, VA
January 6, 2007; 2:00 pm, Comcast		at Old Dominion	L 63–65	6–7 (0–3)	21 – Thomas	9 – Thomas	4 – Campbell	Ted Constant Convocation Center (7,372); Norfolk, VA
January 8, 2007; 7:00 pm, MASN		UNC-Wilmington	W 55–34	7–7 (1–3)	11 – Carter	8 – Thomas	4 – Carter	Patriot Center (4,120); Fairfax, VA
January 11, 2007; 7:00 pm, ESPNU		at Towson	W 73–44	8–7 (2–3)	16 – Campbell	7 – Carter, Monroe	9 – Campbell	Towson Center (2,479); Towson, MD
January 13, 2007; 2:00 pm, MASN		James Madison	W 73–52	9–7 (3–3)	16 – Vaughan	9 – Thomas	5 – Carter	Patriot Center (8,044); Fairfax, VA
January 16, 2007; 7:00 pm, MASN		at William & Mary	W 76–63	10–7 (4–3)	19 – Thomas	6 – Vaughan	4 – Carter, Thomas	Kaplan Arena (2,729); Williamsburg, VA
January 20, 2007; 4:00 pm, MASN		Northeastern	W 78–53	11–7 (5–3)	20 – Thomas	8 – Campbell	5 – Carter, Norwood	Patriot Center (6,928); Fairfax, VA
January 24, 2007; 7:00 pm, Comcast		Virginia Commonwealth	L 62–75	11–8 (5–4)	19 – Campbell	9 – Campbell	4 – Carter, Thomas	Patriot Center (7,579); Fairfax, VA
January 27, 2007; 2:00 pm, Comcast		at James Madison	W 59–41	12–8 (6–4)	17 – Campbell	6 – Campbell, Thomas	4 – Campbell, Thomas	JMU Convocation Center (5,151); Harrisonburg, VA
January 29, 2007; 7:00 pm, MASN		at UNC-Wilmington	L 58–65	12–9 (6–5)	17 – Campbell	7 – Vaughan	6 – Campbell	Trask Coliseum (4,986); Wilmington, NC
January 31, 2007; 7:00 pm, MASN		Delaware	W 89–59	13–9 (7–5)	21 – Campbell	5 – Campbell, Monroe, Vaughan	4 – Campbell, Carter, Norwood	Patriot Center (4,553); Fairfax, VA
February 3, 2007; 6:00 pm, ESPNU		Old Dominion	L 56–66	13–10 (7–6)	23 – Campbell	11 – Monroe, Thomas	3 – Campbell	Patriot Center (9,804); Fairfax, VA
February 8, 2007; 7:00 pm, ESPNU		at Virginia Commonwealth	L 49–63	13–11 (7–7)	17 – Thomas	12 – Thomas	3 – Carter, Monroe, Thomas	Stuart C. Siegel Center (7,585); Richmond, VA
February 10, 2007; 4:00 pm, ESPN		Hofstra	L 60–68	13–12 (7–8)	14 – Campbell	6 – Monroe, Thomas	5 – Campbell	Patriot Center (7,800); Fairfax, VA
February 14, 2007; 7:00 pm, MASN		at Delaware	W 66–46	14–12 (8–8)	14 – Thomas	9 – Thomas	4 – Monroe	Bob Carpenter Center (2,778); Newark, DE
February 17, 2007*; 4:00 pm, ESPN360		Kent State; Homecoming/ESPN Bracket Busters	L 62–68	14–13	12 – Monroe, Thomas	10 – Thomas	5 – Monroe, Thomas	Patriot Center (9,073); Fairfax, VA
February 20, 2007; 7:00 pm, MASN		Georgia State	W 60–54	15–13 (9–8)	14 – Carter	8 – Monroe, Thomas	6 – Thomas	Patriot Center (4,567); Fairfax, VA
February 24, 2007; 1:00 pm		at Northeastern	L 50–73	15–14 (9–9)	8 – Campbell, Thomas	9 – Carter	2 – Norwood, Smith, Thomas	Matthews Arena (2,214); Boston
CAA tournament
March 2, 2007; 8:30 pm	(6)	vs. (11) James Madison; First Round	W 73–62	16–14	26 – Smith	7 – Birdsong	8 – Campbell	Richmond Coliseum (5,176); Richmond, VA
March 3, 2007; 8:30 pm, Cox	(6)	vs. (3) Hofstra; Quarterfinals	W 64–61	17–14	16 – Campbell	10 – Monroe	6 – Campbell	Richmond Coliseum (6,311); Richmond, VA
March 4, 2007; 5:30 pm	(6)	vs. (2) Old Dominion; Semifinals	W 79–63	18–14	19 – Smith	9 – Birdsong	4 – Campbell	Richmond Coliseum (11,200); Richmond, VA
March 5, 2007; 7:00 pm, ESPN	(6)	vs. (1) Virginia Commonwealth; Championship	L 59–65	18–15	12 – Smith	5 – Monroe	4 – Campbell	Richmond Coliseum (11,200); Richmond, VA
*Non-conference game. ^{#}Rankings from Coaches' Poll. (#) Tournament seedings in parentheses. All times are in Eastern Time.

== Recruiting ==
The following is a list of players signed for the 2007–08 season:

College recruiting information
Name	Hometown	School	Height	Weight	Commit date
Vlad Moldoveanu; PF	Bucharest, Romania	St. John’s College	6 ft 9 in (2.06 m)	185 lb (84 kg)	Oct 11, 2006
Vlad Moldoveanu; PF	Recruit ratings: Scout: Rivals:				
Cam Long; SG	Woodbridge, Virginia	Freedom	6 ft 3 in (1.91 m)	175 lb (79 kg)	Sep 18, 2006
Cam Long; SG	Recruit ratings: Scout: Rivals:				
Isaiah Tate; SG	Hyattsville, Maryland	DeMatha	6 ft 2 in (1.88 m)	175 lb (79 kg)	Aug 24, 2006
Isaiah Tate; SG	Recruit ratings: Scout: Rivals:				
Jay Threatt; PG	Highland Springs, Virginia	Highland Springs	5 ft 8 in (1.73 m)	165 lb (75 kg)	May 9, 2007
Jay Threatt; PG	Recruit ratings: Scout:				
Overall recruit ranking:
Note: In many cases, Scout, Rivals, 247Sports, On3, and ESPN may conflict in their listings of height and weight.; In these cases, the average was taken. ESPN grades are on a 100-point scale.; Sources: "ESPN". ESPN.; "2007 Team Ranking". Rivals.
