= 1996–97 Montana Grizzlies basketball team =

American college basketball season

1996–97 Montana Grizzlies basketball

Big Sky tournament champions

NCAA tournament
- Conference: Big Sky Conference
- Record: 21–11 (11–5 Big Sky)
- Head coach: Blaine Taylor (6th season)
- Home arena: Adams Fieldhouse

1996–97 Big Sky men's basketball standings
	Conf.				Overall
Team	W		L	PCT	W		L	PCT
Northern Arizona	14	–	2	.875	21	–	7	.750
Montana †	11	–	5	.688	21	–	11	.656
Montana State	10	–	6	.625	16	–	14	.533
Weber State	9	–	7	.563	15	–	13	.536
Idaho State	9	–	7	.563	14	–	13	.519
Cal State Northridge	8	–	8	.500	14	–	15	.483
Portland State	6	–	10	.375	9	–	17	.346
Eastern Washington	3	–	13	.188	7	–	19	.269
Sacramento State	2	–	14	.125	3	–	23	.115
† Conference tournament winner

The 1996–97 Montana Grizzlies basketball team represented the University of Montana during the 1996–97 NCAA Division I basketball season. The Grizzlies were led by sixth-year head coach Blaine Taylor and played their home games on campus at Adams Fieldhouse in Missoula, Montana.

They finished the regular season at 19–10, with an 11–5 record in conference to finish second in the regular season standings. The Grizzlies earned an automatic berth to the NCAA tournament by winning the Big Sky Conference tournament.

In the opening round of the NCAA Tournament at the Jon M. Huntsman Center in Salt Lake City, Utah, Montana faced the No. 1 seed and defending champion Kentucky. The Grizzlies were beaten handily, 92–54, by the eventual National runner-up.

== Postseason results ==
Date time, TV	Rank^{#}	Opponent^{#}	Result	Record	Site (attendance) city, state
Big Sky tournament
Mar 7, 1997*		vs. Weber State; Semifinals	W 81–56	20–10	Walkup Skydome; Flagstaff, Arizona
Mar 8, 1997*		vs. Cal State Northridge; Championship game	W 82–79	21–10	Walkup Skydome; Flagstaff, Arizona
NCAA tournament
Mar 13, 1997*	(16 W)	vs. (1 W) No. 5 Kentucky; First round	L 54–92	21–11	Jon M. Huntsman Center (13,832); Salt Lake City, Utah
*Non-conference game. ^{#}Rankings from AP Poll. (#) Tournament seedings in parentheses. W=West. All times are in Mountain time.
