= Mike Anderson (basketball, born 1986) =

American professional basketball player

Mike Anderson マイク・アンダーソン
Personal information
- Born: April 7, 1986 (age 39) Virginia Beach, Virginia, U.S.
- Listed height: 201 cm (6 ft 7 in)
- Listed weight: 93 kg (205 lb)

Career information
- High school: Landstown (Virginia Beach, Virginia)
- College: VCU (2004–2008)
- NBA draft: 2008: undrafted
- Playing career: 2009–2016
- Position: Forward
- Number: 24

Career history
- 2009: Quebec Kebs
- 2009: Halifax Rainmen
- 2009: BasketClubs Vienna
- 2010: BK Inter Bratislava
- 2011: Dakota Wizards
- 2012: Fort Wayne Mad Ants
- 2013: Akita Northern Happinets
- 2014: BC Nokia
- 2014–2016: Garra Cañera de Navolato

Michael Anderson (born April 7, 1986) is an American professional basketball player who last played for the Garra Cañera de Navolato of the Circuito de Baloncesto de la Costa del Pacífico.

== College statistics ==
Year	Team	GP	GS	MPG	FG%	3P%	FT%	RPG	APG	SPG	BPG	PPG
2004–05	VCU	25	5	8.2	.317	.182	.579	1.16	0.36	0.12	0.28	1.56
2005–06	VCU	29	4	14.7	.391	.258	.556	2.90	0.66	0.59	0.41	3.28
2006–07	VCU	35	35	22.2	.479	.211	.759	4.86	0.49	1.03	0.69	6.43
2007–08	VCU	31	29	23.7	.442	.356	.614	4.61	0.71	0.81	0.90	7.16
Career		120	73	18.7	.434	.283	.659	3.55	0.56	0.68	0.59	4.84

== Career statistics ==
Legend
GP	Games played	GS	Games started	MPG	Minutes per game
FG%	Field goal percentage	3P%	3-point field goal percentage	FT%	Free throw percentage
RPG	Rebounds per game	APG	Assists per game	SPG	Steals per game
BPG	Blocks per game	PPG	Points per game	**Bold**	Career high

=== Regular season ===
Year	Team	GP	GS	MPG	FG%	3P%	FT%	RPG	APG	SPG	BPG	PPG
2009–10	BK Inter	12		33.9	.504	.261	.705	6.7	1.8	2.4	0.3	18.4
2010–11	BC Vienna	21		31.2	.525	.108	.578	6.4	0.6	1.5	1.1	16.0
2010–11	DAK	50	22	28.8	.511	.250	.713	5.34	1.30	1.12	1.18	12.08
2011–12	DAK	46	22	23.8	.475	.296	.664	4.83	0.93	0.70	1.20	10.46
2012–13	FWN	18	5	21.3	.365	.000	.707	3.89	1.22	1.00	0.61	6.28
2012–13	Akita	22		24.2	.409	.163	.553	5.6	1.8	1.4	0.7	9.9
2013–14	Nokia	11		28.3	.442	.167	.750	6.5	1.3	1.4	1.0	12.9
2014–15	Navolato	22	21	33.3	.512	.325	.690	8.18	2.32	1.45	1.00	18.91
2015–16	Navolato	4	4	22.7	.692	.000	.625	5.75	0.75	0.75	0.75	10.25

=== Playoffs ===
Year	Team	GP	GS	MPG	FG%	3P%	FT%	RPG	APG	SPG	BPG	PPG
2011–12	DAK	2	0	12.6	.583	.600	1.000	1.50	1.00	0.50	0.50	9.50
2013–14	Nokia	8		32.3	.538	.133	.735	7.8	1.9	0.9	1.5	15.9
