= 1997 Big Sky Conference men's basketball tournament =

Men's basketball tournament

- Classification: Division I
- Season: 1996–97
- Teams: 6
- Site: Walkup Skydome; Flagstaff, Arizona
- Champions: Montana (3rd title)
- Winning coach: Blaine Taylor (2nd title)
- MVP: Trenton Cross (Cal State Northridge)

1996–97 Big Sky men's basketball standings
	Conf.				Overall
Team	W		L	PCT	W		L	PCT
Northern Arizona	14	–	2	.875	21	–	7	.750
Montana †	11	–	5	.688	21	–	11	.656
Montana State	10	–	6	.625	16	–	14	.533
Weber State	9	–	7	.563	15	–	13	.536
Idaho State	9	–	7	.563	14	–	13	.519
Cal State Northridge	8	–	8	.500	14	–	15	.483
Portland State	6	–	10	.375	9	–	17	.346
Eastern Washington	3	–	13	.188	7	–	19	.269
Sacramento State	2	–	14	.125	3	–	23	.115
† Conference tournament winner

The 1997 Big Sky Conference men's basketball tournament was the 22nd edition, held March 6–8 at the Walkup Skydome at Northern Arizona University in Flagstaff, Arizona.

Second-seeded Montana defeated sixth-seeded Cal State Northridge in the championship game, 82–79, to clinch their third Big Sky tournament title. Northridge had upset host and top-seed Northern Arizona in the semifinals.

== Format ==
In the summer of 1996, longtime Big Sky members Idaho (1963) and Boise State (1970) departed for the Big West, and three new teams were added: Cal State Northridge, Portland State, and Sacramento State. Northridge and Sac State came from the recently defunct American West Conference, and total conference membership was nine.

Similar to the previous year, the top six teams in the regular season conference standings participated in the tournament. The top two earned byes into the semifinals while the remaining four played in the quarterfinals. The lowest remaining seed met the top seed in the semifinals.

== Bracket ==
Quarterfinals; Thursday, March 6
3	Montana State	56
6	Cal State Northridge	74
4	Weber State	68
5	Idaho State	58

Semifinals; Friday, March 7
1	Northern Arizona	84
6	Cal State Northridge	93
2	Montana	81
4	Weber State	56

Championship; Saturday, March 8
6	Cal State Northridge	79
2	Montana	82

== NCAA tournament ==
Montana received the automatic bid to the NCAA tournament, and no other Big Sky members were invited. Seeded sixteenth in the West regional, the Grizzlies lost to defending champion Kentucky in the first round at Salt Lake City.

Northern Arizona was invited to the NIT, but lost in the first round at Arkansas.

== See also ==
- American West Conference men's basketball tournament (1995–1996)
- Big Sky Conference women's basketball tournament
