= Richmond High School for the Arts =

Public high school in Virginia, US

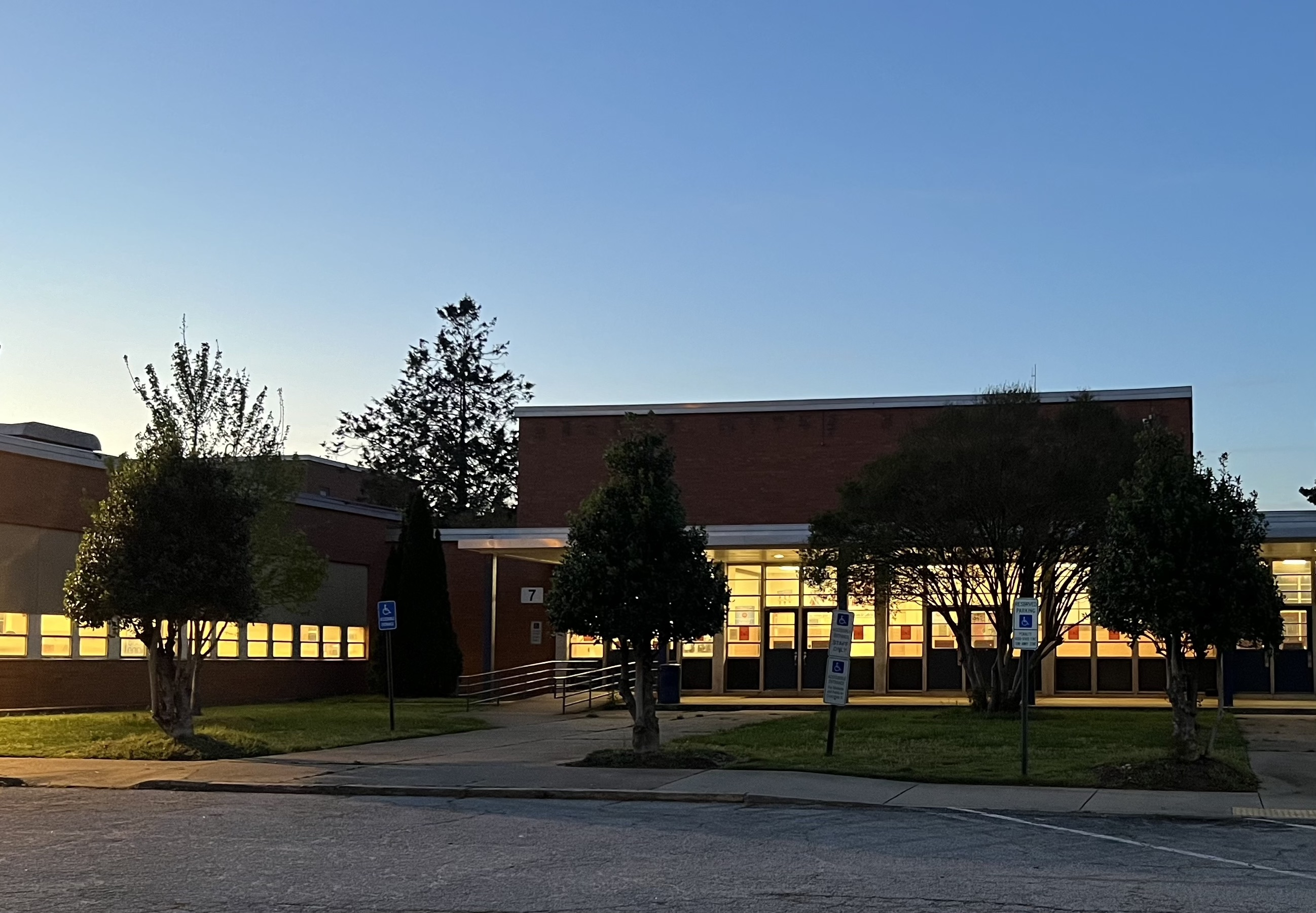

Location
- 4314 Crutchfield Street; Richmond, Virginia 23225; United States
- 37°30′38″N 77°28′59″W

Information
- School type: Public high school
- Founded: 1960; 2023 (rename)
- School district: Richmond Public Schools
- Superintendent: Jason Kamras
- Principal: Kevin Olds
- Grades: 9–12
- Enrollment: 1,296 (2023–2024)
- Student to teacher ratio: 18:1
- Language: English
- Campus: Urban
- Colors: Red, white, and blue
- Mascot: Bulldogs
- Website: https://rhsa.rvaschools.net

Richmond High School for the Arts, formerly known as George Wythe High School, is a high school located in Richmond, Virginia, United States, part of the Richmond Public Schools, serving grades 9–12.

== History ==
In 2023, the city school board voted to rename George Wythe to "Richmond High School for the Arts".

== Demographics ==
As of the 2022–23 school year, the student body is 50.3% Hispanic and 46.1% Black, with 97.5% minority enrollment. Eighty-six percent of students were economically disadvantaged and on the free-lunch program.

== Student performance ==
As of the 2022–23 school year, 11% of the school's students had taken at least one AP test, and the graduation rate was 61%. Proficiency in mathematics was at 8%, while reading and science were at 36% and 18%, respectively.

== Notable alumni ==
- Ray Epps, former professional basketball player
- Kim Hamilton, former gymnast and motivational speaker, salutatorian of the 1986 class
- Lawrence Jackson, White House photographer in the Obama and Biden administrations
- Jesse Pellot, former professional basketball player
- Paul Pressey, former professional basketball player
- Kevin Snead, professional football player and former sprinter
