= Blaine Taylor =

American college basketball coach (born 1958)

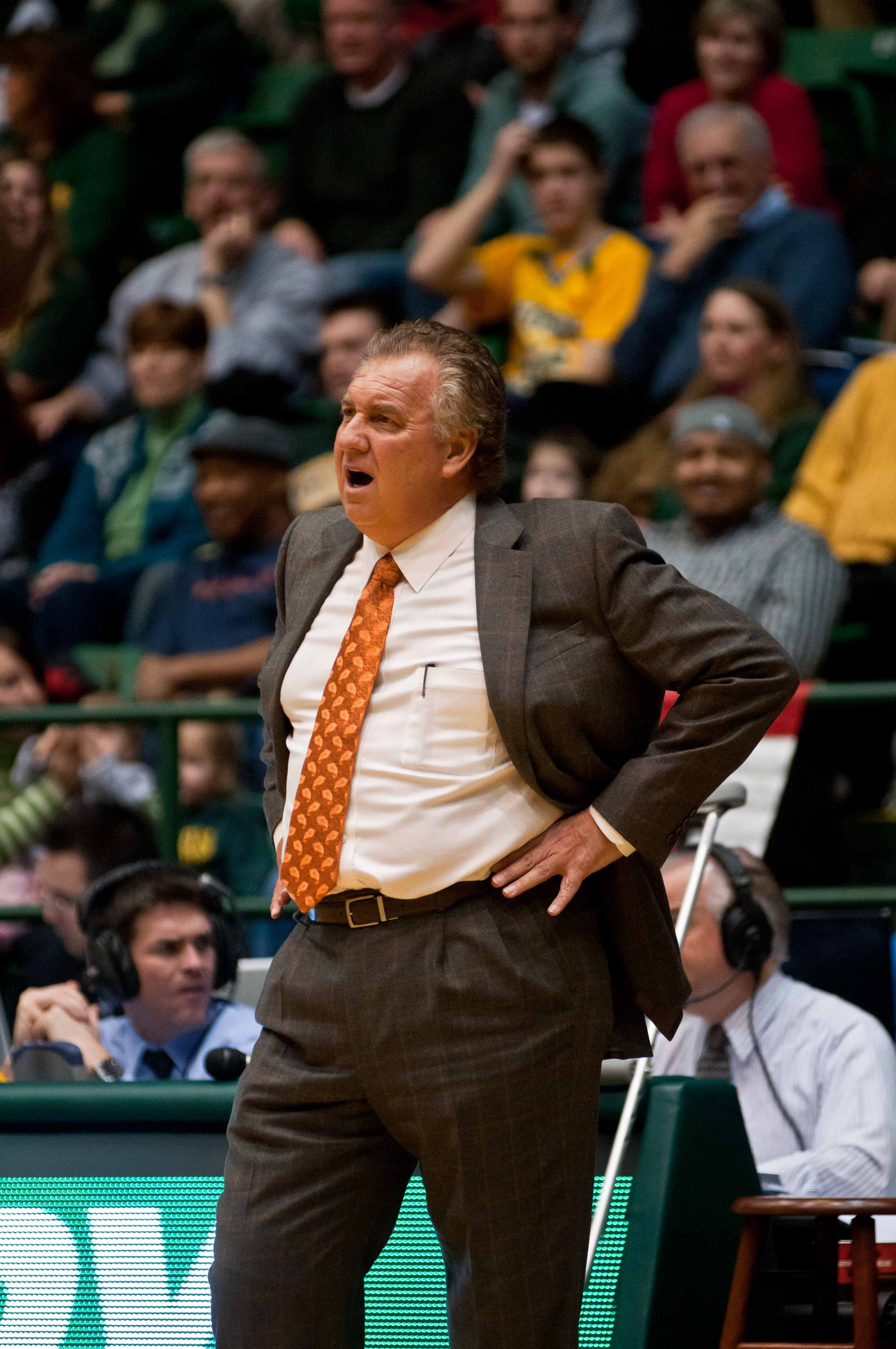
- Taylor in 2012

Biographical details
- Born: January 14, 1958 (age 68); Butte, Montana, U.S.

Playing career
- 1979–1981: Montana
- Position: Point guard

Coaching career (HC unless noted)
- 1981–1983: Montana (assistant)
- 1983–1986: Loyola Sacred Heart HS
- 1986–1991: Montana (assistant)
- 1991–1998: Montana
- 1998–2001: Stanford (assistant)
- 2001–2013: Old Dominion
- 2016–2020: UC Irvine (assistant)

Head coaching record
- Overall: 380–210 (college)
- Tournaments: 1–6 (NCAA Division I); 3–2 (NIT); 1–1 (CBI); 6–1 (CIT)

Accomplishments and honors

Championships
- CIT (2009); 2 Big Sky regular season (1992, 1995); 2 Big Sky tournament (1992, 1997); CAA regular season (2005, 2010); 3 CAA tournament (2005, 2010, 2011)

Awards
- Big Sky Coach of the Year (1992); CAA Coach of the Year (2005)

Blaine Taylor (born January 14, 1958) is a former American college basketball coach most well known for being the head coach of the Old Dominion Monarchs men's basketball team from 2001 until 2013.

Taylor played as a point guard for the University of Montana from 1979 to 1981. In 1981, he was recognized as the school's most outstanding male athlete and earned the Naseby Rhinehart Award as the Most Inspirational Player. Taylor later became an assistant coach at Montana while a graduate student from 1981 to 1984 and again became an assistant to Stew Morrill from 1986 to 1991. He was promoted to head coach of the Grizzlies in 1991 and led the team to two NCAA tournament appearances through 1998. Taylor became an assistant coach under former Grizzly coach Mike Montgomery at Stanford University from 1998 to 2001. The Cardinal were invited to the NCAA tournament during every year of Taylor's tenure, reaching the Elite Eight in the 2001 NCAA Division I men's basketball tournament.

During his tenure at Old Dominion, Taylor has led the Monarchs to CAA Tournament championships in 2005, 2010, and 2011 and appearances in the NCAA tournament in 2005, 2007, 2010, and 2011. The Monarchs lost in their first NCAA tournament game on three of Taylor's trips, but broke through with a first round victory over Notre Dame in 2010 before losing to Baylor in the second round. Taylor also led the Monarchs to the 2006 NIT semifinals, where the team lost to the Michigan Wolverines. The Monarchs also won the inaugural CollegeInsider.com Postseason Tournament in 2009. On February 5, 2013, Taylor was fired by Old Dominion in the middle of a 2–20 season. In the summer of 2016, it was announced that Taylor was hired by Russell Turner, head coach of UC Irvine as an assistant. The two had both worked as assistants at Stanford. After stepping down from UC Irvine to have ankle and knee replacement surgery, Taylor returned to Old Dominion to work as fundraiser for the university's athletic foundation.

== Head coaching record ==
Record table
Season	Team	Overall	Conference	Standing	Postseason
Montana Grizzlies (Big Sky Conference) (1991–1998)
1991–92	Montana	27–4	14–2	1st	NCAA Division I First Round
1992–93	Montana	17–11	8–6	4th	
1993–94	Montana	19–9	6–8	6th	
1994–95	Montana	21–9	11–3	T–1st	NIT First Round
1995–96	Montana	20–8	10–4	3rd	
1996–97	Montana	21–11	11–5	2nd	NCAA Division I First Round
1997–98	Montana	16–14	9–7	5th	
Montana:		141–66 (.681)	69–35 (.663)		
Old Dominion Monarchs (Colonial Athletic Association) (2001–2013)
2001–02	Old Dominion	13–16	7–11	7th	
2002–03	Old Dominion	12–15	9–9	6th	
2003–04	Old Dominion	17–12	11–7	4th	
2004–05	Old Dominion	28–6	15–3	1st	NCAA Division I First Round
2005–06	Old Dominion	24–10	13–5	4th	NIT Semifinal
2006–07	Old Dominion	24–9	15–3	2nd	NCAA Division I First Round
2007–08	Old Dominion	18–16	11–7	4th	CBI Quarterfinal
2008–09	Old Dominion	25–10	12–6	3rd	CIT champion
2009–10	Old Dominion	27–9	15–3	1st	NCAA Division I Second Round
2010–11	Old Dominion	27–7	14–4	2nd	NCAA Division I First Round
2011–12	Old Dominion	22–14	13–5	4th	CIT Quarterfinal
2012–13	Old Dominion	2–20	0–10	11th	
Old Dominion:		239–144 (.624)	135–73 (.649)		
Total:		380–210 (.644)			
National champion Postseason invitational champion Conference regular season champion Conference regular season and conference tournament champion Division regular season champion Division regular season and conference tournament champion Conference tournament champion
