= 2006–07 VCU Rams men's basketball team =

American college basketball season

2006–07 VCU Rams men's basketball

CAA regular season and tournament champions

NCAA Tournament, second round
- Conference: Colonial Athletic Association
- Record: 28–7 (16–2 CAA)
- Head coach: Anthony Grant
- Assistant coaches: Tony Pujol; John Brannen; Allen Edwards
- Home arena: Stuart C. Siegel Center

2006–07 CAA men's basketball standings
| | Conf. | | | | Overall |
| Team | W | | L | PCT | W | | L | PCT |
|---|---|---|---|---|---|---|---|---|
| VCU† | 16 | – | 2 | .889 | 28 | – | 7 | .800 |
| Old Dominion | 15 | – | 3 | .833 | 24 | – | 9 | .727 |
| Hofstra | 13 | – | 5 | .722 | 23 | – | 9 | .719 |
| Drexel | 13 | – | 5 | .722 | 23 | – | 9 | .719 |
| George Mason | 9 | – | 9 | .500 | 18 | – | 15 | .545 |
| Northeastern | 9 | – | 9 | .500 | 13 | – | 19 | .406 |
| Towson | 8 | – | 10 | .444 | 15 | – | 17 | .469 |
| William & Mary | 5 | – | 13 | .278 | 11 | – | 20 | .355 |
| Georgia State | 5 | – | 13 | .278 | 9 | – | 21 | .300 |
| UNC Wilmington | 4 | – | 14 | .222 | 7 | – | 22 | .241 |
| James Madison | 4 | – | 14 | .222 | 7 | – | 23 | .233 |
| Delaware | 3 | – | 15 | .167 | 5 | – | 26 | .161 |
† 2007 CAA tournament winner Rankings from AP poll

The 2006–07 VCU Rams men's basketball team represented Virginia Commonwealth University during the 2006–07 NCAA Division I men's basketball season. The Rams played in the Colonial Athletic Association.

VCU won the CAA tournament, defeating George Mason in the championship game. They earned a bid to the NCAA tournament, where they beat Duke in the first round before losing to Pittsburgh in the round of 32.

== Schedule ==
| Date time, TV | Rank^{#} | Opponent^{#} | Result | Record | High points | High rebounds | High assists | Site (attendance) city, state |
Non-conference regular season
| November 13, 2006*; 12:00 pm | | at Longwood | W 75–63 | 1–0 | 15 – Maynor | 7 – Anderson | 6 – Maynor | Willett Hall (2,522); Farmville, VA |
| November 17, 2006*; 6:00 pm | | vs. Xavier; Paradise Jam quarterfinals | L 67–70 | 1–1 | 21 – Walker | 6 – Maynor | 5 – Walker | Sports and Fitness Center (1,200); St. Thomas, USVI |
| November 18, 2006*; 8:30 pm | | vs. Charleston; Paradise Jam consolation 2nd round | W 71–59 | 2–1 | 21 – Pellot-Rosa | 6 – Maynor | 5 – Walker | Sports and Fitness Center (2,138); St. Thomas, USVI |
| November 20, 2006*; 3:30 pm | | vs. Toledo; Paradise Jam 5th place game | L 59–60 | 2–2 | 13 – Pellot-Rosa | 7 – Pellot-Rosa | 4 – Maynor | Sports and Fitness Center (1,400); St. Thomas, USVI |
| November 25, 2006*; 7:30 pm | | Hampton | W 74–51 | 3–2 | 20 – Pellot-Rosa | 7 – Pellot-Rosa | 4 – Maynor | Siegel Center (4,876); Richmond, VA |
| November 28, 2006*; 7:00 pm | | at Elon | W 91–49 | 4–2 | 15 – Maynor | 6 – Maynor | 7 – Maynor | Alumni Gym (1,232); Elon, NC |
| December 2, 2006*; 7:30 pm | | Houston | W 102–84 | 5–2 | 28 – Maynor | 9 – Gwynn | 11 – Maynor | Siegel Center (5,244); Richmond, VA |
| December 6, 2006*; 7:00 pm | | at Albany | W 75–57 | 6–2 | – | – | – | SEFCU Arena (2,009); Guilderland, NY |
| December 9, 2006; 7:00 pm | | vs. Richmond; Black & Blue Classic | W 68–54 | 7–2 | 20 – Gwynn | 9 – Fameni | 11 – Maynor | Richmond Coliseum (6,225); Richmond, VA |
| December 16, 2006*; 7:30 pm | | UAB | W 53–44 | 8–2 | 12 – Maynor | 8 – Anderson | 5 – Maynor | Siegel Center (4,124); Richmond, VA |
| December 20, 2006; 7:00 pm | | Delaware | W 79–60 | 9–2 (1–0) | 23 – Fameni | 11 – Fameni | 7 – Maynor | Siegel Center (3,186); Richmond, VA |
| December 30, 2006*; 7:30 pm | | Appalachian State | L 70–73 | 9–3 | 27 – Maynor | 10 – Anderson | 7 – Maynor | Siegel Center (4,107); Richmond, VA |
CAA regular season
| January 3, 2007; 7:00 pm | | at Towson | W 84–80 ^{2OT} | 10–3 (2–0) | 26 – Walker | 10 – Fameni | 12 – Maynor | Towson Center (1,165); Towson, MD |
| January 6, 2007; 7:00 pm | | at James Madison | W 77–61 | 11–3 (3–0) | 24 – Walker | 10 – Fameni | 4 – Fameni | JMU Convocation Center (3,830); Harrisonburg, VA |
| January 8, 2007; 7:00 pm | | Northeastern | W 64–44 | 12–3 (4–0) | 13 – Pellot-Rosa | 10 – Fameni | 5 – Maynor | Siegel Center (2,923); Richmond, VA |
| January 10, 2007; 7:00 pm | | at William & Mary | W 88–77 | 13–3 (5–0) | 22 – Gwynn | 6 – Shuler | 6 – Maynor | Kaplan Arena (2,412); Williamsburg, VA |
| January 14, 2007; 7:30 pm | | Towson | W 85–77 | 14–3 (6–0) | 22 – Maynor | 7 – Pellot-Rosa | 6 – Rosa | Siegel Center (6,463); Richmond, VA |
| January 17, 2007; 7:30 pm | | UNC Wilmington | W 74–65 | 15–3 (7–0) | 24 – Pellot-Rosa | 7 – Fameni | 5 – Maynor | Siegel Center (6,024); Richmond, VA |
| January 20, 2007; 5:30 pm | | Old Dominion; Rivalry | W 80–75 | 16–3 (8–0) | 23 – Maynor | 9 – Pellot-Rosa | 6 – Maynor | Siegel Center (7,694); Richmond, VA |
| January 24, 2007; 7:00 pm | | at George Mason; Rivalry | W 75–62 | 17–3 (9–0) | 24 – Walker | 10 – Maynor | 10 – Maynor | Patriot Center (7,579); Fairfax, VA |
| January 27, 2007; 12:00 pm | | at Drexel | W 75–68 | 18–3 (10–0) | 24 – Walker | 6 – Fameni | 4 – Maynor | Daskalakis Athletic Center (2,511); Philadelphia, PA |
| January 29, 2007; 7:30 pm | | William & Mary | W 90–68 | 19–3 (11–0) | 24 – Shuler | 7 – Pellot-Rosa | 7 – Maynor | Siegel Center (6,228); Richmond, VA |
| January 31, 2007; 0:00 pm | | at Hofstra | L 68–79 | 19–4 (11–1) | 17 – Shuler | 14 – Fameni | 7 – Maynor | Hofstra Arena (5,023); Hempstead, NY |
| February 3, 2007; 0:00 pm | | Georgia State | W 100–71 | 20–4 (12–1) | – | – | – | Siegel Center; Richmond, VA |
| February 8, 2007; 0:00 pm | | George Mason; Rivalry | W 63–49 | 21–4 (13–1) | – | – | – | Siegel Center; Richmond, VA |
| February 10, 2007; 12:00 pm | | at Old Dominion; Rivalry | L 63–79 | 21–5 (13–2) | – | – | – | Ted Constant Convocation Center; Norfolk, VA |
| February 14, 2007; 0:00 pm | | at UNC Wilmington | W 78–68 | 22–5 (14–2) | – | – | – | Trask Coliseum; Wilmington, NC |
| February 17, 2007*; 0:00 pm | | Bradley; ESPN BracketBusters | L 64–73 | 22–6 | – | – | – | Siegel Center; Richmond, VA |
| February 21, 2007; 0:00 pm | | James Madison | W 83–72 | 23–6 (15–2) | – | – | – | Siegel Center; Richmond, VA |
| February 24, 2007; 0:00 pm | | at Georgia State | W 72–70 | 24–6 (16–2) | – | – | – | GSU Sports Arena; Atlanta, GA |
CAA tournament
| March 3, 2007; 12:00 pm | (1) | vs. (9) Georgia State; Quarterfinals | W 73–60 | 25–6 | 14 – Gwynn | 8 – Gwynn | 8 – Maynor | Richmond Coliseum; Richmond, VA |
| March 4, 2007; 3:00 pm | (1) | vs. (4) Drexel; Semifinals | W 63–56 | 26–6 | 16 – Anderson | 8 – Anderson | 3 – Maynor | Richmond Coliseum; Richmond, VA |
| March 5, 2007; 7:00 pm, ESPN | (1) | vs. (6) George Mason; Championship | W 65–59 | 27–6 | 20 – Maynor | 8 – Fameni | 4 – Maynor | Richmond Coliseum (11,200); Richmond, VA |
NCAA tournament
| March 15, 2007*; 7:10 pm, CBS | (W 11) | vs. (W 6) No. 24 Duke; First Round | W 79–77 | 28–6 | 22 – Maynor | 7 – Anderson | 8 – Maynor | HSBC Arena (18,843); Buffalo, NY |
| March 17, 2007*; 5:50 pm, CBS | (W 11) | vs. (W 3) No. 12 Pittsburgh; Second Round | L 79–84 ^{OT} | 28–7 | 20 – Pellot-Rosa | 10 – Anderson | 8 – Maynor | HSBC Arena (18,801); Buffalo, NY |
*Non-conference game. ^{#}Rankings from AP Poll. (#) Tournament seedings in parentheses.
