= Jesse Pellot =

American basketball player (born 1984)

Jesse Pellot-Rosa
Personal information
- Born: July 4, 1984 (age 42) Richmond, Virginia
- Listed height: 6 ft 4 in (1.93 m)
- Listed weight: 195 lb (88 kg)

Career information
- High school: George Wythe (Richmond, Virginia)
- College: VCU (2003–2007)
- NBA draft: 2007: undrafted
- Playing career: 2007–2017
- Position: Forward

Career history
- 2007-2008: Cariduros de Fajardo
- 2008-2009: SISU Copenhagen
- 2009: Keflavík
- 2009–2012: Atléticos de San Germán
- 2009–2010: Maccabi Haifa
- 2011–2012: Quimsa
- 2013: Piratas de Quebradillas
- 2013–2014: Vaqueros de Bayamón
- 2013–2014: Club Malvin
- 2013–2015: Club Ciclista Olímpico
- 2015–2016: Ferro
- 2016: Piratas de Quebradillas
- 2016–2017: Vaqueros de Bayamón
- 2017: Þór Þorlákshöfn

Career highlights
- BSN Most Valuable Player (2009); BSN Most Improved Player (2009); Icelandic Supercup (2017)

Jesse Pellot-Rosa (born July 4, 1984) is an American former professional basketball player.

== College career ==
He went to George Wythe High School and college at Virginia Commonwealth University (VCU) (2003-2007).

== Professional career ==
After going undrafted at the 2007 NBA draft, Pellot-Rosa has been active with different teams in Argentina's Liga Nacional de Básquet, Puerto Rico's Baloncesto Superior Nacional, and other European leagues. In 2009, he won both the BSN Most Improved Player and the BSN Most Valuable Player Award. He was also named as part of the league All-Star Team.

In May 2017, Úrvalsdeild karla club Þór Þorlákshöfn announced it had signed Pellot-Rosa for the upcoming 2017–18 season. On October 1, he helped Þór win the Icelandic Supercup by defeating the defending national champions KR 90-86. In the game he had 37 points and 11 rebounds. Pellot-Rosa left the club in November due to injury after averaging 20.8 points and 7.2 rebounds.

== The Basketball Tournament ==
In 2017, Pellot-Rosa participated in The Basketball Tournament for Ram Nation, a team of VCU alumni. The team made it to the Elite 8 where they lost to eventual tournament champs Overseas Elite. The Basketball Tournament is an annual $2 million winner-take-all tournament broadcast on ESPN.

== See also ==
- List of Puerto Ricans
