= Sam Harris (basketball) =

Australian basketball player

Personal information
- Born: 3 May 1984 (age 42) Launceston, Tasmania
- Listed height: 221 cm (7 ft 3 in)
- Listed weight: 123 kg (271 lb)

Career information
- High school: Launceston College (Launceston, Tasmania); Lake Ginninderra College (Canberra, ACT)
- College: Old Dominion (2004–2008)
- NBA draft: 2008: undrafted
- Playing career: 2001–2013
- Position: Centre

Career history
- 2001–2004: Australian Institute of Sport
- 2008: NW Tasmania Thunder
- 2008–2009: Singapore Slingers
- 2009: NW Tasmania Thunder
- 2009–2010: Perth Wildcats
- 2010: East Perth Eagles
- 2010–2011: Adelaide 36ers
- 2011: Bendigo Braves
- 2012: Hobart Chargers
- 2012–2013: NW Tasmania Thunder

Career highlights
- NBL champion (2010)
Medals
Men's basketball
Representing Australia
FIBA U19 World Cup
Gold medal – first place	2003 Greece	Team

Samuel James Harris (born 3 May 1984) is an Australian former professional basketball player. He played 10 seasons in the South East Australian Basketball League (SEABL) and spent two seasons in the National Basketball League (NBL).

== Early life ==
Harris was born in Launceston, Tasmania, and grew up in the suburb of Newnham. He started playing basketball in the late 1990s and attended Launceston College.

In 2001, Harris moved to Canberra to attend the Australian Institute of Sport (AIS) and play for the AIS men's team in the South East Australian Basketball League (SEABL). With Lake Ginninderra College at the 2001 National Schools Basketball Tournament in Ballarat, the 17-year-old Harris stood at 219 cm—4 cm taller than the previous student record. He continued on with the AIS in 2002, 2003 and 2004, playing in the SEABL each year.

== College career ==
Between 2004 and 2008, Harris played college basketball for Old Dominion University in the United States. As a freshman, on 27 November 2004, he scored a career-high 14 points. In 126 games for the Monarchs over four seasons, he made 17 starts and averaged 1.8 points and 1.5 rebounds in 7.5 minutes per game.

== Professional career ==
Harris returned to Tasmania in May 2008 and played out the SEABL season with the NW Tasmania Thunder.

In late April 2008, Harris signed with the Singapore Slingers for the 2008–09 NBL season. However, the team withdrew from the NBL in late July 2008 to pursue competitions closer to home. Harris remained with the squad that was kept together, with the Slingers engaging in a series of touring matches during the 2008–09 season, most notably the Singapore Challenge Series that ended in January 2009. In 11 games during the Challenge Series, Harris averaged 6.5 points, 3.2 rebounds and 1.8 blocks per game.

For the 2009 SEABL season, Harris returned to the NW Tasmania Thunder, where he averaged 18 points and 11 rebounds while finishing with 73 blocked shots.

Following the conclusion of the 2009 SEABL season, Harris moved to Perth to train with the Perth Wildcats ahead of the 2009–10 NBL season. He was elevated to the full squad in mid-October as an injury replacement for Paul Rogers, and was later replaced in the line-up by American Galen Young in late December. He remained a member of the Wildcats' shadow squad for the rest of the season, and in March 2010, he became an NBL champion when the Wildcats defeated the Wollongong Hawks in the grand final series. He totalled six points and seven rebounds in six games for the Wildcats.

Harris remained in Perth during the 2010 off-season and played for the East Perth Eagles in the SBL.

In June 2010, Harris began to dabble in the prospect of switching to Australian rules football, as he was recruited by West Perth Football Club with the plan being to debut in the WAFL with the Falcons in 2011.

Ahead of the 2010–11 NBL season, Harris had been in contention for a full NBL contract with the Wildcats but missed out due to the club's need to satisfy a league rule to sign an under-24 player. As a result, in August 2010, he joined the training squad of the Adelaide 36ers. He played two games for the 36ers in November 2010.

Following the 2010–11 NBL season, Harris joined the Bendigo Braves for the 2011 SEABL season. He went on to split the 2012 SEABL season with the Hobart Chargers and NW Tasmania Thunder. He returned to the Thunder in 2013 for one final season.

== National team career ==
Harris was a member of the Australian under 18 squad in 1999 and 2000, and a member of the Australian under 20 squad in 2001 and 2002. In 2003, he helped Australia win gold at the FIBA Under-19 World Championship in Greece. In 2005, he played for Australia at the FIBA Under-21 World Championship.

== Personal ==
Harris' father is 196 cm and his mother is 177 cm.
