= Johnny Jones (basketball, born 1961) =

American basketball college coach

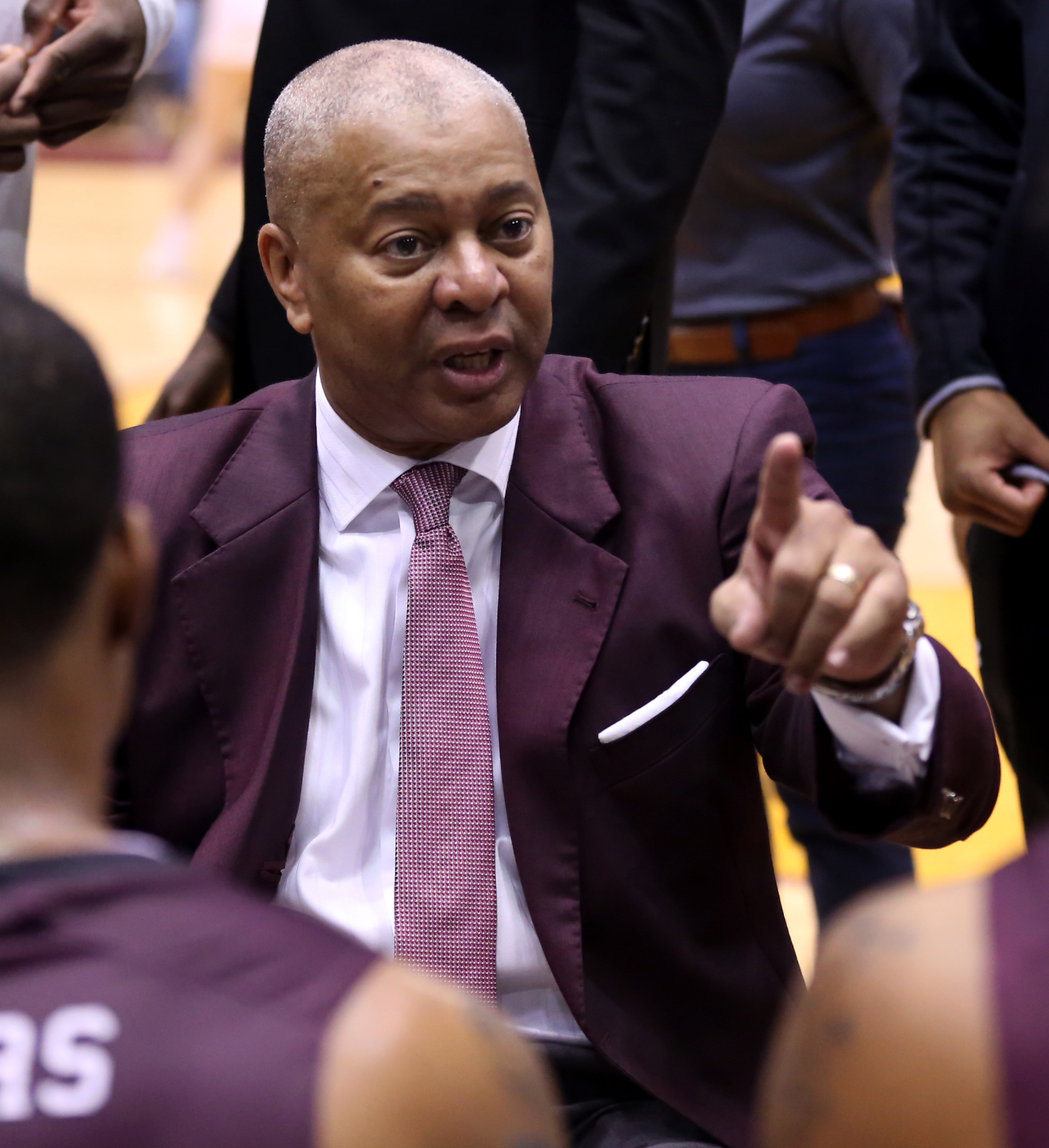
- Jones in 2019

Current position
- Title: Assistant coach
- Team: LSU
- Conference: SEC

Biographical details
- Born: March 30, 1961 (age 65); DeRidder, Louisiana, U.S.

Playing career
- 1980–1984: LSU

Coaching career (HC unless noted)
- 1984–1997: LSU (assistant)
- 1997–1999: Memphis (assistant)
- 1999–2000: Memphis (interim HC)
- 2000–2001: Alabama (assistant)
- 2001–2012: North Texas
- 2012–2017: LSU
- 2017–2018: Nevada (associate HC)
- 2018–2026: Texas Southern
- 2026–present: LSU (assistant)

Head coaching record
- Overall: 428–359 (.544)
- Tournaments: 2–6 (NCAA Division I); 1–1 (NIT); 3–2 (CIT)

Accomplishments and honors

Championships
- 2 Sun Belt tournament (2007, 2010); Sun Belt regular season (2010); 3 SWAC tournament (2021–2023)

John Henry Jones Jr. (born March 30, 1961) is an American college basketball coach who is an assistant coach of the LSU Tigers basketball team. He was formerly the men's basketball head coach at Texas Southern, North Texas and at his alma mater LSU.

== Playing career ==
Jones played in the 1981 Final Four as a freshman at LSU, and later served 12 seasons as an assistant coach at LSU under Dale Brown where the pair returned to the 1986 Final Four.

== Coaching career ==
=== Head coaching career ===
==== Memphis ====
Jones was named interim head coach at the University of Memphis just prior to the 1999–2000 season, replacing Tic Price. He coached the team to a 15–16 record.

==== North Texas ====
During Jones' stint at North Texas, he coached the Mean Green to five-straight 20-win seasons from 2007 to 2011, and two Sun Belt tournament championships and NCAA tournament bids. Under Jones, North Texas was just the third program to advance to three consecutive Sun Belt Tournament championship games.

==== LSU ====
At LSU, Jones compiled a 90–72 (.556) overall record with a 42–48 (.467) SEC record in 5 seasons. He led LSU to one NCAA tournament berth during the 2014–15 season, losing to N.C. State in the opening round, and one NIT berth in 2013–14. Jones' team was invited to participate in the NIT in the 2016 season but the University stepped in and declined the offer.

==== Texas Southern ====
Jones was named head basketball coach at Texas Southern on June 27, 2018.

== Head coaching record ==
Record table
| Season | Team | Overall | Conference | Standing | Postseason |
|---|---|---|---|---|---|
Memphis Tigers (Conference USA) (1999–2000)
| 1999–2000 | Memphis | 15–16 | 7–9 | 5th (National) | |
| Memphis: | | 15–16 (.484) | 7–9 (.438) | | |
North Texas Mean Green (Sun Belt Conference) (2001–2012)
| 2001–02 | North Texas | 15–14 | 8–7 | 4th (West) | |
| 2002–03 | North Texas | 7–21 | 2–13 | 6th (West) | |
| 2003–04 | North Texas | 13–15 | 8–8 | 3rd (West) | |
| 2004–05 | North Texas | 14–14 | 6–9 | T–4th (West) | |
| 2005–06 | North Texas | 14–14 | 6–9 | T–4th (West) | |
| 2006–07 | North Texas | 23–11 | 10–8 | 3rd (West) | NCAA Division I Round of 64 |
| 2007–08 | North Texas | 20–11 | 10–8 | 3rd (West) | |
| 2008–09 | North Texas | 20–12 | 11–7 | 2nd (West) | |
| 2009–10 | North Texas | 24–9 | 13–5 | 1st (West) | NCAA Division I Round of 64 |
| 2010–11 | North Texas | 22–11 | 8–8 | 4th (West) | |
| 2011–12 | North Texas | 18–14 | 9–7 | 4th (West) | |
| North Texas: | | 190–146 (.565) | 91–89 (.506) | | |
LSU Tigers (Southeastern Conference) (2012–2017)
| 2012–13 | LSU | 19–12 | 9–9 | T–8th | |
| 2013–14 | LSU | 20–14 | 9–9 | T–6th | NIT Second Round |
| 2014–15 | LSU | 22–11 | 11–7 | T–3rd | NCAA Division I Round of 64 |
| 2015–16 | LSU | 19–14 | 11–7 | T–3rd | |
| 2016–17 | LSU | 10–21 | 2–16 | T–13th | |
| LSU: | | 90–72 (.556) | 42–48 (.467) | | |
Texas Southern Tigers (Southwestern Athletic Conference) (2018–present)
| 2018–19 | Texas Southern | 24–14 | 14–4 | 2nd | CIT Semifinal |
| 2019–20 | Texas Southern | 16–16 | 12–6 | 3rd | Postseason Cancelled |
| 2020–21 | Texas Southern | 17–9 | 10–3 | 3rd | NCAA Division I Round of 64 |
| 2021–22 | Texas Southern | 19–13 | 13–5 | 2nd | NCAA Division I Round of 64 |
| 2022–23 | Texas Southern | 14–21 | 7–11 | 8th | NCAA Division I First Four |
| 2023–24 | Texas Southern | 16–17 | 12–6 | T–3rd | CIT First Round |
| 2024–25 | Texas Southern | 15–17 | 12–6 | T–4th | |
| 2025–26 | Texas Southern | 12–18 | 10–8 | T–4th | |
| Texas Southern: | | 133–125 (.516) | 90–49 (.647) | | |
| Total: | | 428–359 (.544) | | | |
National champion Postseason invitational champion Conference regular season champion Conference regular season and conference tournament champion Division regular season champion Division regular season and conference tournament champion Conference tournament champion

=== NCAA tournament ===
| Year | School | Record | Winning % | Notes |
|---|---|---|---|---|
| 2007 | North Texas | 0–1 | .000 | Eliminated by No. 2 (Memphis Tigers) in NCAA First Round |
| 2010 | North Texas | 0–1 | .000 | Eliminated by No. 2 (Kansas State Wildcats) in NCAA First Round |
| 2015 | LSU | 0–1 | .000 | Eliminated by No. 8 (NC State Wolfpack) in NCAA Second Round |
| 2021 | Texas Southern | 1–1 | .500 | Defeated No. 16 (Mount St. Mary's Mountaineers) in NCAA First Four, Eliminated by No. 1 (Michigan Wolverines) in NCAA First Round |
| 2022 | Texas Southern | 1–1 | .500 | Defeated No. 16 (Texas A&M–Corpus Christi Islanders) in NCAA First Four, Eliminated by No. 1 (Kansas Jayhawks) in NCAA First Round |
| 2023 | Texas Southern | 0–1 | .000 | Eliminated by No. 16 (Fairleigh Dickinson Knights) in NCAA First Four |
| Totals | | 2–6 | .250 | 3 NCAA First Four (Won 2), 4 NCAA First Round (Won 0), 1 NCAA Second Round (Won 0) |

=== NIT tournament ===
| Year | School | Record | Winning % | Notes |
|---|---|---|---|---|
| 2014 | LSU | 1–1 | .500 | Defeated (San Francisco Dons) in NIT First Round, Eliminated by (SMU Mustangs) in NIT Second Round |
| Totals | | 1–1 | .500 | made 1 NIT Second Round (Won 0) |

=== CIT tournament ===
| Year | School | Record | Winning % | Notes |
|---|---|---|---|---|
| 2019 | Texas Southern | 3–1 | .750 | Defeated (New Orleans Privateers) in CIT First Round, Defeated (UTRGV Valley Vaqueros) in CIT Second Round, Defeated (Louisiana–Monroe) in CIT Quarterfinals, Eliminated by (Green Bay Phoenix) in CIT Semifinals |
| 2024 | Texas Southern | 0–1 | .000 | Eliminated by (Tarleton State Texans) in CIT First Round |
| Totals | | 3–2 | .600 | made 1 CIT Semifinals (Won 0) |

== Personal life ==
Jones' son, John, is a college basketball player; he played as a walk-on for the Nevada Wolf Pack under his father during the 2017–18 season and transferred to the Texas Southern Tigers when his father was hired as head coach in 2018. Jones joined his father's coaching staff at Texas Southern as an assistant coach and director of player development in 2023.
