= Houston–Rice rivalry =

American college football rivalry

- Houston Cougars Rice Owls

Locations in Houston

The Houston–Rice rivalry is a crosstown college rivalry between the Houston Cougars of the University of Houston and Rice Owls of Rice University. The universities are located approximately five miles from one another. It is one of the few NCAA Division I crosstown rivalries, and the closest geographic distance between two Division I Football Bowl Subdivision teams.

The rivalry existed in a more official capacity after Houston joined the now-defunct Southwest Conference in 1971, in which Rice was a charter member. Since the breakup of that conference in 1995, the rivalry has continued. In 2005, Rice joined Conference USA, of which Houston was a member, and again made the rivalry more relevant for conference titles as well. The two schools were once again in separate conferences after the 2012–13 school year once Houston joined the American Athletic Conference. Rice moved into the American in 2023, but at the same time Houston moved to the Big 12 Conference, so the two schools continue to compete in separate conferences.

== Baseball ==
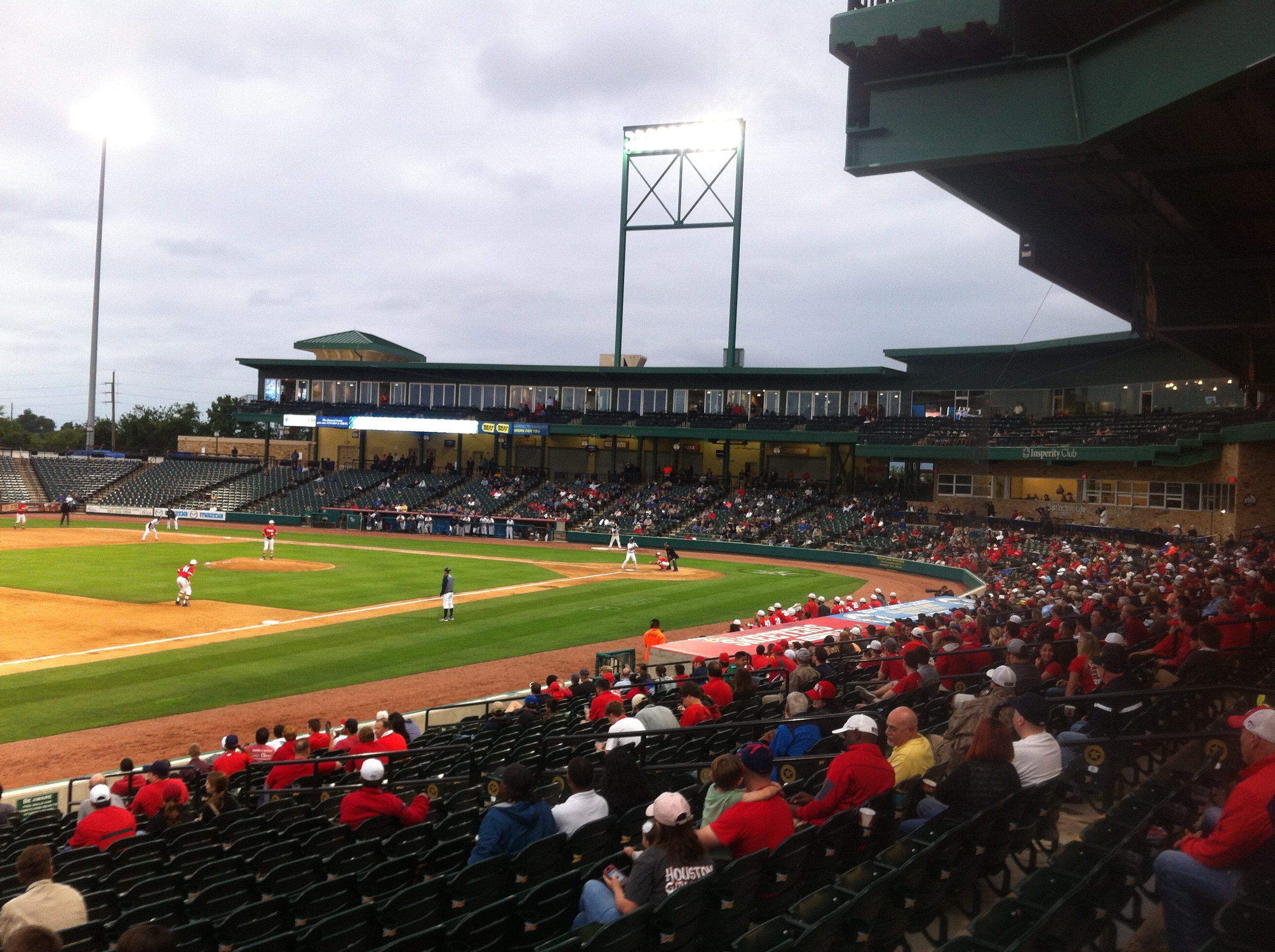
A game of the Silver Glove Series at Constellation Field in Sugar Land, Texas

The winner of the Silver Glove series between UH and Rice receives an award dubbed the "Silver Cup Trophy". The teams played against each other for the first time in 1948. Through the 2026 season, Rice leads the series 110–96.

Both teams compete in the annual Houston College Classic, which began in 2001.

== Men's basketball ==
Bayou Cup
- Sport: Basketball
- Teams: Houston Cougars; Rice Owls
- First meeting: January 8, 1972; Houston 101, Rice 73
- Latest meeting: December 6, 2023; Houston 75, Rice 39
- Next meeting: TBD

Statistics
- Total meetings: 84
- All-time series: Houston leads, 66–18
- Largest victory: Houston, 106–56 (January 12, 1977)
- Longest win streak: Houston, 17 (January 8, 1972–January 3, 1980)
- Current win streak: Houston, 8 (March 6, 2013–present)

Since 2002, Rice and Houston have competed for an award dubbed the "Bayou Cup" in men's basketball. Through the 2024–25 season, Houston leads the series 66–18.

=== Game results ===
Rankings are from the AP poll released prior to the game.

Houston victories	Rice victories

No.	Date	Location	Winner	Score
1	January 8, 1972	Houston Astrodome	Houston	101–73
2	January 16, 1973	Rice Gymnasium	#12 Houston	96–77
3	March 5, 1973	Hofheinz Pavilion	#7 Houston	116–72
4	January 12, 1974	Rice Gymnasium	Houston	95–86
5	March 7, 1974	Hofheinz Pavilion	Houston	107–62
6	January 11, 1975	Hofheinz Pavilion	Houston	91–70
7	March 11, 1975	Rice Gymnasium	Houston	82–73
8	January 10, 1976	Hofheinz Pavilion	Houston	87–59
9	February 7, 1976	Rice Gymnasium	Houston	99–79
10	January 12, 1977	Hofheinz Pavilion	Houston	106–56
11	February 8, 1977	Rice Gymnasium	Houston	109–73
12	January 21, 1978	Hofheinz Pavilion	Houston	96–74
13	February 11, 1978	Rice Gymnasium	Houston	87–62
14	February 25, 1978^{A}	Hofheinz Pavilion	Houston	108–67
15	January 20, 1979	Rice Gymnasium	Houston	101–75
16	February 10, 1979	Hofheinz Pavilion	Houston	75–72
17	January 3, 1980	Hofheinz Pavilion	Houston	78–70
18	February 19, 1980	Rice Gymnasium	Rice	81–74
19	February 25, 1980^{B}	Hofheinz Pavilion	Houston	92–80
20	January 3, 1981	Rice Gymnasium	Houston	62–57
21	February 24, 1981	Hofheinz Pavilion	Houston	63–55
22	January 4, 1982	Hofheinz Pavilion	#14 Houston	63–61
23	February 23, 1982	Rice Gymnasium	Houston	75–69
24	January 26, 1983	Rice Gymnasium	#9 Houston	76–40
25	February 26, 1983	Hofheinz Pavilion	#2 Houston	86–52
26	January 20, 1984	Hofheinz Pavilion	#4 Houston	72–42
27	February 22, 1984	Rice Gymnasium	#3 Houston	70–54
28	March 10, 1984^{C}	The Summit	#5 Houston	53–50
29	January 16, 1985	Rice Gymnasium	Houston	77–73
30	February 17, 1985	Hofheinz Pavilion	Houston	96–91
31	January 11, 1986	Hofheinz Pavilion	Rice	71–68
32	February 12, 1986	Rice Gymnasium	Houston	71–69
33	January 10, 1987	Rice Gymnasium	Houston	71–36
34	February 7, 1987	Hofheinz Pavilion	Houston	75–62
35	February 3, 1988	Hofheinz Pavilion	Houston	84–67
36	March 5, 1988	Rice Gymnasium	Houston	81–65
37	January 4, 1989	Hofheinz Pavilion	Houston	90–75
38	February 4, 1989	Rice Gymnasium	Rice	67–66
39	January 6, 1990	Rice Gymnasium	Houston	84–69
40	February 7, 1990	Hofheinz Pavilion	Houston	84–67
41	March 9, 1990^{D}	Reunion Arena	Houston	90–81
42	January 9, 1991	Hofheinz Pavilion	Houston	80–73
43	February 9, 1991	Rice Gymnasium	Rice	79–69

No.	Date	Location	Winner	Score
44	January 18, 1992	Rice Gymnasium	Houston	74–60
45	February 19, 1992	Hofheinz Pavilion	Houston	86–83
46	February 2, 1993	Hofheinz Pavilion	Rice	65–61
47	March 3, 1993	Rice Gymnasium	Rice	89–78 ^{OT}
48	February 5, 1994	Rice Gymnasium	Houston	69–67
49	March 5, 1994	Hofheinz Pavilion	Houston	78–76
50	January 11, 1995	Hofheinz Pavilion	Rice	87–76
51	February 8, 1995	Rice Gymnasium	Houston	73–67
52	January 13, 1996	Rice Gymnasium	Houston	76–74
53	February 10, 1996	Hofheinz Pavilion	Houston	63–59
54	November 21, 1998	Rice Gymnasium	Rice	69–64
55	December 7, 1999	Hofheinz Pavilion	Houston	84–71 ^{OT}
56	November 21, 2000	Rice Gymnasium	Rice	65–45
57	November 29, 2001	Hofheinz Pavilion	Houston	62–61
58	November 27, 2002	Rice Gymnasium	Rice	71–53
59	December 3, 2003	Hofheinz Pavilion	Rice	62–52
60	November 30, 2004	Rice Gymnasium	Rice	74–73
61	January 11, 2006	Rice Gymnasium	Rice	71–62
62	March 1, 2006	Hofheinz Pavilion	Houston	74–71
63	January 17, 2007	Rice Gymnasium	Rice	76–71
64	January 31, 2007	Hofheinz Pavilion	Houston	70–63
65	March 9, 2007^{E}	FedExForum	Houston	77–62
66	January 23, 2008	Reliant Arena	Houston	69–60
67	February 23, 2008	Hofheinz Pavilion	Houston	71–62
68	February 7, 2009	Hofheinz Pavilion	Houston	72–65
69	February 28, 2009	Tudor Fieldhouse	Houston	56–51
70	January 6, 2010	Tudor Fieldhouse	Houston	83–66
71	March 3, 2010	Hofheinz Pavilion	Houston	78–70
72	January 26, 2011	Tudor Fieldhouse	Rice	79–71 ^{OT}
73	March 5, 2011	Hofheinz Pavilion	Rice	72–57
74	February 8, 2012	Hofheinz Pavilion	Rice	79–71
75	March 3, 2012	Tudor Fieldhouse	Houston	76–75
76	January 30, 2013	Tudor Fieldhouse	Rice	79–69
77	March 6, 2013	Hofheinz Pavilion	Houston	84–62
78	March 13, 2013^{F}	BOK Center	Houston	72–67
79	December 21, 2013	Toyota Center	Houston	54–52
80	January 28, 2015	Hofheinz Pavilion	Houston	59–48
81	November 14, 2018	H&PE Arena	Houston	79–68
82	November 19, 2019	Tudor Fieldhouse	Houston	97–89
83	November 12, 2021	Fertitta Center	#15 Houston	79–46
84	December 6, 2023	Fertitta Center	#3 Houston	75–39
Series: Houston leads 66–18

==== Notes ====
^{A} 1978 Southwest Conference men's basketball tournament
^{B} 1980 Southwest Conference men's basketball tournament
^{C} 1984 Southwest Conference men's basketball tournament
^{D} 1990 Southwest Conference men's basketball tournament
^{E} 2007 Conference USA men's basketball tournament
^{F} 2013 Conference USA men's basketball tournament

== Football ==
Bayou Bucket Classic
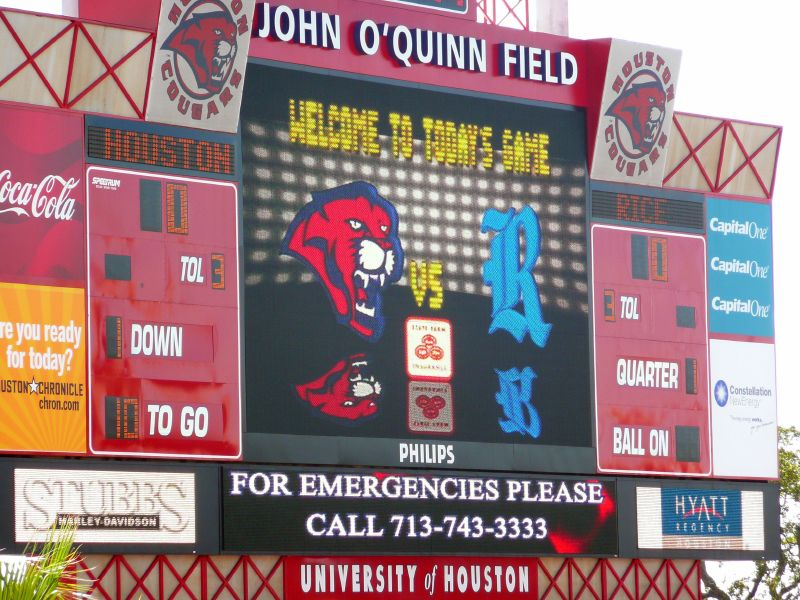
- The scoreboard at Robertson Stadium before the 2007 Bayou Bucket game
- Sport: Football
- Teams: Houston Cougars; Rice Owls
- First meeting: September 11, 1971; Houston 23, Rice 21
- Latest meeting: September 6, 2025; Houston 35, Rice 9
- Next meeting: TBD

Statistics
- Total meetings: 47
- All-time series: Houston leads 35–12
- Largest victory: Houston: 64–0 (1989); Rice: 37–7 (1993)
- Longest win streak: Houston: 7 (2011–2022)
- Current win streak: Houston: 2 (2024–present)

The football rivalry, sometimes referred to as the Bayou Bucket Classic, is the longest running competition between the two institutions. Both teams are part of the NCAA's Division I Football Bowl Subdivision.

The first official game between the teams was played in 1971 when Houston joined the now-defunct Southwest Conference of which Rice was also a member. The teams previously met in a 1946 scrimmage marking Houston's inaugural season. For many years the competition included an annual regular-season football game between the schools. The winner receives the "Bayou Bucket", which is a full-sized trophy with a golden bucket on top.

Although the last Southwest Conference football game was part of the series, the teams no longer compete against each other regularly. However, they still play as non-conference foes as future schedules allow. Houston leads the series 35–12 through the 2025 season.

=== Notable games ===
September 11, 1971: The first-ever matchup between Houston and Rice, The Cougars claimed a 23–21 victory over the Owls in what is still the most attended game in series history, with 62,000 people showing up to watch.

December 2, 1995: In what was the last football game in Southwest Conference history, Houston came away with a thrilling 18–17 victory over Rice, thanks to two fourth quarter touchdown passes from quarterback Chuck Clements.

October 27, 2011: No. 18 Houston cruised to a 73–34 victory over Rice behind nine touchdown passes from star quarterback Case Keenum. The game is notable for being the one in which Keenum set the all-time NCAA Division I passing touchdowns record.

September 9, 2023: Despite relinquishing a 21-point lead, Rice prevailed over Houston 43–41 in double-overtime to claim their first victory in the series since 2010.

=== Game results ===
Rankings are from the AP poll released prior to the game.

Houston victories	Rice victories

No.	Date	Location	Winning team		Losing team	
1	September 11, 1971	Rice Stadium	Houston	23	Rice	21
2	September 9, 1972	Rice Stadium	Rice	14	Houston	13
3	September 15, 1973	Astrodome	#18 Houston	24	Rice	6
4	September 14, 1974	Rice Stadium	#19 Houston	21	Rice	0
5	September 13, 1975	Astrodome	Rice	24	Houston	7
6	November 27, 1976	Rice Stadium	#7 Houston	42	Rice	20
7	November 26, 1977	Rice Stadium	Houston	51	Rice	21
8	December 2, 1978	Astrodome	#9 Houston	49	Rice	25
9	December 1, 1979	Rice Stadium	#10 Houston	63	Rice	0
10	November 29, 1980	Astrodome	Rice	35	Houston	7
11	November 28, 1981	Rice Stadium	Houston	40	Rice	3
12	November 27, 1982	Astrodome	Houston	28	Rice	21
13	September 1, 1983	Rice Stadium	Houston	45	Rice	14
14	December 1, 1984	Astrodome	Houston	38	Rice	26
15	November 30, 1985	Rice Stadium	Houston	24	Rice	20
16	November 29, 1986	Astrodome	Rice	14	Houston	13
17	November 28, 1987	Rice Stadium	Houston	45	Rice	21
18	November 26, 1988	Astrodome	#14 Houston	45	Rice	14
19	December 2, 1989	Rice Stadium	#13 Houston	64	Rice	0
20	September 29, 1990	Astrodome	#13 Houston	24	Rice	22
21	November 16, 1991	Rice Stadium	Houston	41	Rice	21
22	November 28, 1992	Astrodome	Houston	61	Rice	34
23	November 26, 1993	Rice Stadium	Rice	37	Houston	7
24	November 26, 1994	Astrodome	Rice	31	Houston	13

No.	Date	Location	Winning team		Losing team	
25	December 2, 1995	Rice Stadium	Houston	18	Rice	17
26	September 4, 1999	Robertson Stadium	Houston	28	Rice	3
27	September 2, 2000	Rice Stadium	Rice	30	Houston	27 ^{OT}
28	September 1, 2001	Robertson Stadium	Rice	21	Houston	14
29	August 31, 2002	Rice Stadium	Houston	24	Rice	10
30	August 30, 2003	Robertson Stadium	Houston	48	Rice	14
31	September 5, 2004	Reliant Stadium	Rice	10	Houston	7
32	November 26, 2005	Robertson Stadium	Houston	35	Rice	18
33	September 2, 2006	Rice Stadium	Houston	31	Rice	30
34	October 13, 2007	Robertson Stadium	Houston	56	Rice	48
35	September 20, 2008	Rice Stadium	Rice	56	Houston	42
36	November 28, 2009	Robertson Stadium	#25 Houston	73	Rice	14
37	October 16, 2010	Rice Stadium	Rice	34	Houston	31
38	October 27, 2011	Robertson Stadium	#18 Houston	73	Rice	34
39	September 29, 2012	Reliant Stadium	Houston	35	Rice	14
40	September 21, 2013	Reliant Stadium	Houston	31	Rice	26
41	September 16, 2017	TDECU Stadium	Houston	38	Rice	3
42	September 1, 2018	Rice Stadium	Houston	45	Rice	27
43	September 11, 2021	Rice Stadium	Houston	44	Rice	7
44	September 24, 2022	TDECU Stadium	Houston	34	Rice	27
45	September 9, 2023	Rice Stadium	Rice	43	Houston	41 ^{2OT}
46	September 14, 2024	TDECU Stadium	Houston	33	Rice	7
47	September 6, 2025	Rice Stadium	Houston	35	Rice	9
Series: Houston leads 35–12

== See also ==
- List of NCAA college football rivalry games
