= 2006–07 UAB Blazers men's basketball team =

American college basketball season

2006–07 UAB Blazers men's basketball
- Conference: Conference USA
- Record: 15-16 (7-9 C-USA)
- Head coach: Mike Davis (4th season)
- Home arena: Bartow Arena

2006–07 Conference USA men's basketball standings
	Conf.				Overall
Team	W		L	PCT	W		L	PCT
No. 5 Memphis†	16	–	0	1.000	33	–	4	.892
UCF	11	–	5	.688	22	–	9	.710
Houston	10	–	6	.625	18	–	15	.545
Southern Miss	9	–	7	.563	20	–	11	.645
Tulsa	9	–	7	.563	20	–	11	.645
Tulane	9	–	7	.563	17	–	13	.567
Rice	8	–	8	.500	16	–	16	.500
UAB	7	–	9	.438	15	–	16	.484
Marshall	7	–	9	.438	13	–	19	.406
UTEP	6	–	10	.375	14	–	17	.452
SMU	3	–	13	.188	14	–	17	.452
East Carolina	1	–	15	.063	6	–	24	.200
† 2007 C-USA Tournament winner Rankings from AP Poll

The 2006–07 UAB Blazers men's basketball team represented the University of Alabama at Birmingham as a member of the Conference USA during the 2006–07 NCAA Division I men's basketball season. The team was coached by Mike Davis and the Blazers played their home games at Bartow Arena.

On December 30, 2006, UAB lost to Florida in the Orange Bowl Basketball Classic 75–70.

They finished the season 15-16 and their season ended with a 53–52 loss to Marshall in the CUSA tournament first round in March 2007.
