= 2007 Sun Belt Conference men's basketball tournament =

- Classification: Division I
- Season: 2006–07
- Teams: 13
- Site: Cajundome; Lafayette, Louisiana
- Champions: North Texas (1st title)
- Winning coach: Johnny Jones (1st title)
- MVP: Calvin Watson (North Texas)

2006–07 Sun Belt Conference men's basketball standings
| | Conf. | | | | Overall |
| Team | W | | L | PCT | W | | L | PCT |
|---|---|---|---|---|---|---|---|---|
East
| South Alabama | 13 | – | 5 | .722 | 20 | – | 12 | .625 |
| Western Kentucky | 12 | – | 6 | .667 | 22 | – | 11 | .667 |
| Florida Atlantic | 10 | – | 8 | .556 | 16 | – | 15 | .516 |
| Troy | 8 | – | 10 | .444 | 13 | – | 17 | .433 |
| Middle Tennessee | 8 | – | 10 | .444 | 15 | – | 17 | .469 |
| Florida International | 7 | – | 11 | .389 | 12 | – | 17 | .414 |
West
| Arkansas State | 11 | – | 7 | .611 | 18 | – | 15 | .545 |
| Louisiana–Monroe | 11 | – | 7 | .611 | 18 | – | 14 | .563 |
| North Texas † | 10 | – | 8 | .556 | 23 | – | 11 | .676 |
| New Orleans | 9 | – | 9 | .500 | 14 | – | 17 | .452 |
| Arkansas-Little Rock | 8 | – | 10 | .444 | 13 | – | 17 | .433 |
| Louisiana–Lafayette | 7 | – | 11 | .389 | 9 | – | 21 | .300 |
| Denver | 3 | – | 15 | .167 | 4 | – | 25 | .138 |
† 2007 Sun Belt Conference tournament winner Rankings from AP Poll

The 2007 Sun Belt Conference men's basketball tournament took place February 28–March 6, 2007 at the Cajundome in Lafayette, Louisiana.

== Bracket ==
First Round; Campus Sites
8 | Troy | 64
9 | Middle Tennessee | 72
4 | Louisiana-Monroe | 83
13 | Denver | 67
5 | North Texas | 93
12 | Louisiana-Lafayette | 78
6 | Florida Atlantic | 91
11 | Florida International | 88
7 | New Orleans | 77
10 | UALR | 70

Quarterfinals
1 | South Alabama | 60
9 | Middle Tennessee | 63
4 | Louisiana-Monroe | 71
5 | North Texas | 77
3 | WKU | 86
6 | Florida Atlantic | 81
2 | Arkansas State | 81
7 | New Orleans | 74

Semifinals
9 | Middle Tennessee | 52
5 | North Texas | 59
3 | WKU | 73
2 | Arkansas State | 80

Championship game
5 | North Texas | 80
2 | Arkansas State | 73
