= 2006–07 North Texas Mean Green men's basketball team =

American college basketball season

2006–07 North Texas Mean Green men's basketball

Sun Belt Tournament Champion

1st Round NCAA vs Memphis, L, 73-58
- Conference: Sun Belt Conference
- West
- Record: 23-11 (10-8 Sun Belt)
- Head coach: Johnny Jones (6th season)
- Home arena: Super Pit

2006–07 Sun Belt Conference men's basketball standings
	Conf.				Overall
Team	W		L	PCT	W		L	PCT
East
South Alabama	13	–	5	.722	20	–	12	.625
Western Kentucky	12	–	6	.667	22	–	11	.667
Florida Atlantic	10	–	8	.556	16	–	15	.516
Troy	8	–	10	.444	13	–	17	.433
Middle Tennessee	8	–	10	.444	15	–	17	.469
Florida International	7	–	11	.389	12	–	17	.414
West
Arkansas State	11	–	7	.611	18	–	15	.545
Louisiana–Monroe	11	–	7	.611	18	–	14	.563
North Texas †	10	–	8	.556	23	–	11	.676
New Orleans	9	–	9	.500	14	–	17	.452
Arkansas-Little Rock	8	–	10	.444	13	–	17	.433
Louisiana–Lafayette	7	–	11	.389	9	–	21	.300
Denver	3	–	15	.167	4	–	25	.138
† 2007 Sun Belt Conference tournament winner Rankings from AP Poll

The 2006–07 North Texas men's basketball team represented the University of North Texas in the 2006–07 college basketball season. The team was led by head coach Johnny Jones. In addition to setting a new school-record with 23 wins, the Mean Green won its first Sun Belt Conference title and advanced for only the second time to the NCAA Division I men's basketball tournament. They were eliminated from the NCAA tournament by Memphis. The Mean Green played their home games on campus at the Super Pit in Denton, Texas.

== Roster ==
Name	Number	Position	Height	Weight	Year	Hometown
Andrew Reinking	25	G	6-4	205	Fr.	Austin, Texas
Ben Bell	1	G	6-3	170	Jr.	Irving, Texas
Calvin Watson	33	G	6-5	215	Sr.	Houston, Texas
Chris Higgs	14	G	6-1	180	So.	Sanger, Texas
Collin Dennis*	3	G	6-2	185	Jr.	North Richland Hills, Texas
Chris Wiggins	20	F	6-7	200	Fr.	Oceanside, California
Harold Edwards	15	F	6-6	215	So.	Mobile, Alabama
Harold Stewart	21	F	6-8	195	So.	Fort Worth, Texas
Jared Ruffin	10	G	6-0	175	Sr.	Omaha, Nebraska
Jonathan Jackson	23	F/C	6-8	240	Jr.	Portland, Oregon
Justin Howerton	34	C	6-10	240	So.	Howe, Texas
Keith Wooden	2	F	6-9	249	Jr.	Lawrence, Kansas
Kendrick Davis	12	G	6-4	195	Sr.	Houston, Texas
Michael Sturns	11	G	6-4	190	Jr.	Fort Worth, Texas
Quincy Williams	32	F	6-8	230	Jr.	Forest Park, Oklahoma
Rich Young	13	G/F	6-5	205	Sr.	Farrell, Pennsylvania
Roderick Flemings*	24	G/F	6-7	215	So.	DeSoto, Texas

*Not eligible to compete in a game until the 2007–08 season due to NCAA transferring rules

== Schedule ==
Date time, TV	Rank^{#}	Opponent^{#}	Result	Record	Site (attendance) city, state
Exhibition
Nov. 7, 2006; 7:00 pm		Texas College	W 92-71	0-0	Super Pit (N/A); Denton, Texas
Regular season
Nov. 10, 2006; 7:00 pm		Cameron*	W 92-71	1–0	Super Pit (1,047); Denton, Texas
Nov. 12, 2006; 12:00 pm		at Charlotte*	W 90-72	2–0	Dale F. Halton Arena (5,129); Charlotte, North Carolina
Nov. 15, 2006; 7:00 pm		UT-Arlington*	L 81-83	2–1	Super Pit (1,824); Denton, Texas
Nov. 18, 2006; 7:05 pm		at Rice*	W 71-69	3–1	Autry Court (1,496); Houston, Texas
Nov. 21, 2006; 7:00 pm		Tulsa*	W 65-63	4-1	Super Pit (1,947); Denton, Texas
Nov. 25, 2006; 7:00 pm		Texas State*	W 95-77	5–1	Super Pit (1,795); Denton, Texas
Nov. 29, 2006; 7:00 pm		at Nebraska*	L 57-76	5–2	Bob Devaney Sports Center (9,787); Lincoln, Nebraska
Dec. 6, 2006; 7:00 pm		at Stephen F. Austin*	W 76-70	6-2	William R. Johnson Coliseum (1,638); Nacogdoches, Texas
Dec. 9, 2006; 2:00 pm		at Nicholls State*	W 74-71	7–2	Stopher Gym (224); Thibodaux, Louisiana
Dec. 16, 2006; 2:00 pm		at New Orleans	L 93-97 ^{2OT}	7-3	Human Performance Center (458); New Orleans, Louisiana
Dec. 19, 2006; 7:00 pm		at Western Kentucky	W 86-85	8-3	E. A. Diddle Arena (N/A); Bowling Green, Kentucky
Dec. 22, 2006; 2:00 pm		Jarvis Christian*	W 94-70	9-3	Super Pit (941); Denton, Texas
Dec. 28, 2006; 7:00 pm		Belhaven*	W 93-66	10-3	Super Pit (1,227); Denton, Texas
Dec. 30, 2006; 7:00 pm		Denver	W 91-79	11-3	Super Pit (1,880); Denton, Texas
Jan. 6, 2007; 7:30 pm		at Arkansas-Little Rock	L 75-86	11–4	Jack Stephens Center (3,312); Little Rock, Arkansas
Jan. 6, 2007; 3:05 pm		at Arkansas State	L 60-84	11-5	Convocation Center (2,961); Jonesboro, Arkansas
Jan. 11, 2007; 7:00 pm		Louisiana-Lafayette	W 73-72 ^{OT}	12-5	Super Pit (2,387); Denton, Texas
Jan. 18, 2007; 6:30 pm		at Florida International	L 66-67	12–6	Pharmed Arena (644); Miami, Florida
Jan. 20, 2007; 7:00 pm		Florida Atlantic	W 76-59	13–6	Super Pit (3,264); Denton, Texas
Jan. 25, 2007; 7:00 pm		Middle Tennessee	W 66-53	14-6	Super Pit (1,323); Denton, Texas
Jan. 28, 2007; 1:30 pm		South Alabama	L 89-90	14-7	Mitchell Center (2,325); Mobile, Alabama
Feb. 1, 2007; 7:00		Troy	W 98-57	15-7	Super Pit (1,384); Denton, Texas
Feb. 3, 2007; 7:00 pm		Western Kentucky	W 74-70	16-7	Super Pit (3,521); Denton, Texas
Feb. 8, 2007; 7:00 pm		New Orleans	L 62-64	16-8	Super Pit (2,461); Denton, Texas
Feb. 10, 2007; 2:30 pm		at Louisiana–Monroe	L 62-66	16-9	Fant–Ewing Coliseum (2,758); Monroe, Louisiana
Feb. 15, 2007; 8:00 pm		at Denver	W 78-65	17-9	Magness Arena (1,024); Denver, Colorado
Feb. 17, 2007; 7:00 pm		Arkansas–Little Rock	W 74-69	18-9	Super Pit (3,112); Denton, Texas
Feb. 22, 2007; 7:00 pm		Arkansas State	L 71-74	18-10	Super Pit (2,174); Denton, Texas
Feb. 24, 2007; 7:05 pm		at Louisiana–Lafayette	W 72-70	19-10	Cajundome (2,931); Lafayette, Louisiana
2007 Sun Belt Conference men's basketball tournament
Feb. 28, 2007; 7:00 pm	(5)	(12) Louisiana–Lafayette; First Round	W 93-78	20-10	Super Pit (2,778); Denton, Texas
Mar. 4, 2007; 3:00 pm	(5)	vs. (4) Louisiana–Monroe; Quarterfinal	W 77-71	21-10	Cajundome (N/A); Lafayette, Louisiana
Mar. 5, 2007; 6:30 pm	(5)	vs. (9) Middle Tennessee; Semifinal	W 59-52	22-10	Cajundome (N/A); Lafayette, Louisiana
Mar. 6, 2007; 8:00 pm, ESPN2	(5)	vs. (2) Arkansas State; Championship	W 83-75	23-10	Cajundome (409); Lafayette, Louisiana
2007 NCAA Division I men's basketball tournament
Mar. 16, 2007; 11:30 am, CBS	(15 S)	vs. (2 S) No. 5 Memphis; First Round	L 58-73	23-11	New Orleans Arena (13,393); New Orleans, Louisiana
*Non-conference game. ^{#}Rankings from Coaches Poll. (#) Tournament seedings in parentheses. S=South. All times are in Central Time.
