= 2006–07 South Alabama Jaguars basketball team =

American college basketball season

2006–07 South Alabama Jaguars men's basketball

Sun Belt East division champions

NIT tournament, first round
- Conference: Sun Belt Conference
- East Division
- Record: 20–12 (13–5 Sun Belt)
- Head coach: John Pelphrey (5th season)
- Assistant coaches: Isaac Brown; Matt Figger
- Home arena: Mitchell Center

2006–07 Sun Belt Conference men's basketball standings
| | Conf. | | | | Overall |
| Team | W | | L | PCT | W | | L | PCT |
|---|---|---|---|---|---|---|---|---|
East
| South Alabama | 13 | – | 5 | .722 | 20 | – | 12 | .625 |
| Western Kentucky | 12 | – | 6 | .667 | 22 | – | 11 | .667 |
| Florida Atlantic | 10 | – | 8 | .556 | 16 | – | 15 | .516 |
| Troy | 8 | – | 10 | .444 | 13 | – | 17 | .433 |
| Middle Tennessee | 8 | – | 10 | .444 | 15 | – | 17 | .469 |
| Florida International | 7 | – | 11 | .389 | 12 | – | 17 | .414 |
West
| Arkansas State | 11 | – | 7 | .611 | 18 | – | 15 | .545 |
| Louisiana–Monroe | 11 | – | 7 | .611 | 18 | – | 14 | .563 |
| North Texas † | 10 | – | 8 | .556 | 23 | – | 11 | .676 |
| New Orleans | 9 | – | 9 | .500 | 14 | – | 17 | .452 |
| Arkansas-Little Rock | 8 | – | 10 | .444 | 13 | – | 17 | .433 |
| Louisiana–Lafayette | 7 | – | 11 | .389 | 9 | – | 21 | .300 |
| Denver | 3 | – | 15 | .167 | 4 | – | 25 | .138 |
† 2007 Sun Belt Conference tournament winner Rankings from AP Poll

The 2006–07 South Alabama Jaguars basketball team represented the University of South Alabama during the 2006–07 NCAA Division I men's basketball season. The Jaguars were led by head coach John Pelphrey, in his fifth season as head coach. They played their home games at the Mitchell Center, and were members of the Sun Belt Conference. They finished the season 20–12, 13–5 in Sun Belt play to finish in first place. They were invited to play in the NIT tournament, but lost in the first round against Syracuse.

== Roster ==
2006–07 South Alabama Jaguars men's basketball team
Players
Coaches

| Pos. | # | Name | Height | Weight | Year | Hometown |
|---|---|---|---|---|---|---|
| G | 2 | Brooks Taylor | 6 ft 3 in (1.91 m) | 190 lb (86 kg) | Fr | Leachville, Arkansas |
| C | 2 | Charles Tabet | 6 ft 9 in (2.06 m) | 225 lb (102 kg) | Fr | Bloomfield Hills, Michigan |
| F | 4 | Trajinski Grigsby | 6 ft 6 in (1.98 m) | 215 lb (98 kg) | So | Nacogdoches, Texas |
| G | 5 | Doan Merritt | 5 ft 9 in (1.75 m) | 193 lb (88 kg) | Jr | Jamaica, New York |
| G | 10 | Demetric Bennett | 6 ft 5 in (1.96 m) | 205 lb (93 kg) | Jr | Albany, Georgia |
| C | 11 | Philip Tabet | 6 ft 9 in (2.06 m) | 210 lb (95 kg) | Fr | Bloomfield Hills, Michigan |
| G | 11 | Carlos Smith | 6 ft 0 in (1.83 m) | 180 lb (82 kg) | Sr | College Park, Georgia |
| F | 13 | Leandro Buboltz | 6 ft 7 in (2.01 m) | 225 lb (102 kg) | Sr | Santa Cruz do Sul, Brazil |
| G | 14 | Steven Cowherd | 6 ft 1 in (1.85 m) | 185 lb (84 kg) | Sr | Coral Springs, Florida |
| G | 20 | Darren Cloud | 6 ft 2 in (1.88 m) | 180 lb (82 kg) | Fr | Evansville, Indiana |
| F | 21 | Brandon Davis | 6 ft 6 in (1.98 m) | 205 lb (93 kg) | So | Birmingham, Alabama |
| F | 24 | Kenny Hooks | 6 ft 7 in (2.01 m) | 215 lb (98 kg) | Jr | Moss Point, Mississippi |
| F | 25 | Ernest Little | 6 ft 9 in (2.06 m) | 230 lb (104 kg) | Jr | Monroe, Alabama |

Head coach

- John Pelphrey (Kentucky)

Assistant coach(es)

- Isaac Brown (Louisiana–Monroe)
- Matt Figger (Eastern Kentucky)

Legend

- (C) Team captain
- (S) Suspended
- (I) Ineligible
- (W) Walk-on
- Injured
- Current redshirt

== Schedule and results ==
| Date time, TV | Rank^{#} | Opponent^{#} | Result | Record | Site (attendance) city, state |
Exhibition
| Nov 5, 2006* | | West Alabama | W 79–65 | – | Mitchell Center; Mobile, Alabama |
Non-conference regular season
| Nov 10, 2006*; 11:00 p.m. | | vs. UC Irvine; Basketball Travelers Classic | W 67–63 | 1–0 | Save Mart Center (10,422); Fresno, California |
| Nov 11, 2006*; 10:00 p.m. | | at Fresno State; Basketball Travelers Classic | L 63–73 | 1–1 | Save Mart Center (10,667); Fresno, California |
| Nov 12, 2006*; 5:00 p.m. | | vs. Winston–Salem State; Basketball Travelers Classic | W 76–58 | 2–1 | Save Mart Center (5,445); Fresno, California |
| Nov 17, 2006* | | Morehead State | W 70–55 | 3–1 | Mitchell Center (2,762); Mobile, Alabama |
| Nov 22, 2006* | | West Florida | W 91–71 | 4–1 | Mitchell Center (2,243); Mobile, Alabama |
| Nov 25, 2006* | | at Bowling Green | L 64–65 | 4–2 | Anderson Arena (1,002); Bowling Green, Ohio |
| Dec 2, 2006* | | Samford | W 59–54 | 5–2 | Mitchell Center (2,420); Mobile, Alabama |
| Dec 6, 2006* | | at Auburn | L 71–82 | 5–3 | Beard–Eaves–Memorial Coliseum (3,175); Auburn, Alabama |
| Dec 9, 2006* | | at Mississippi State | L 46–84 | 5–4 | Humphrey Coliseum (8,248); Starkville, Mississippi |
| Dec 16, 2006* | | Ole Miss; Coors Classic | L 72–82 | 5–5 | Mitchell Center (10,041); Mobile, Alabama |
| Dec 19, 2006* | | Texas College | W 80–56 | 6–5 | Mitchell Center (1,957); Mobile, Alabama |
Sun Belt Regular Season
| Dec 22, 2006 | | at Western Kentucky | L 51–73 | 6–6 (0–1) | E. A. Diddle Arena (4,898); Bowling Green, Kentucky |
| Dec 28, 2006 | | at Arkansas State | W 91–78 | 7–6 (1–1) | Convocation Center (3,467); Jonesboro, Arkansas |
| Jan 2, 2007 | | Middle Tennessee | L 51–59 | 7–7 (1–2) | Mitchell Center (2,056); Mobile, Alabama |
| Jan 4, 2007 | | Florida International | W 69–52 | 8–7 (2–2) | Mitchell Center (2,121); Mobile, Alabama |
| Jan 6, 2007 | | Florida Atlantic | W 101–76 | 9–7 (3–2) | Mitchell Center (2,890); Mobile, Alabama |
| Jan 11, 2007 | | at Troy | W 75–64 | 10–7 (4–2) | Sartain Hall (2,684); Troy, Alabama |
| Jan 13, 2007 | | Arkansas–Little Rock | W 68–54 | 11–7 (5–2) | Mitchell Center (2,939); Mobile, Alabama |
| Jan 16, 2007 | | at Louisiana–Lafayette | W 73–69 | 12–7 (6–2) | Cajundome (1,625); Lafayette, Louisiana |
| Jan 20, 2007 | | at Denver | W 70–64 | 13–7 (7–2) | Magness Arena (1,000); Denver, Colorado |
| Jan 25, 2007 | | Louisiana–Monroe | W 68–54 | 14–7 (8–2) | Mitchell Center (2,482); Mobile, Alabama |
| Jan 28, 2007; 1:30 p.m. | | North Texas | W 90–89 | 15–7 (9–2) | Mitchell Center (2,325); Mobile, Alabama |
| Feb 1, 2007 | | at New Orleans | W 76–58 | 16–7 (10–2) | Human Performance Center (1,003); New Orleans, Louisiana |
| Feb 3, 2007 | | at Middle Tennessee | W 61–38 | 17–7 (11–2) | Murphy Center (4,598); Murfreesboro, Tennessee |
| Feb 8, 2007 | | Western Kentucky | W 73–71 | 18–7 (12–2) | Mitchell Center (5,345); Mobile, Alabama |
| Feb 11, 2007 | | Arkansas State | W 85–67 | 19–7 (13–2) | Mitchell Center (3,696); Mobile, Alabama |
| Feb 14, 2007*; 7:00 p.m. | | at Houston; ESPN BracketBusters | W 66–61 | 20–7 | Hofheinz Pavilion (3,624); Houston, Texas |
| Feb 18, 2007 | | at Florida International | L 67–69 | 20–8 (13–3) | Ocean Bank Convocation Center (607); Miami, Florida |
| Feb 21, 2007 | | at Florida Atlantic | W 85–67 | 20–9 (13–4) | FAU Arena (1,009); Boca Raton, Florida |
| Feb 24, 2007 | | Troy | L 88–92 | 20–10 (13–5) | Mitchell Center (4,627); Mobile, Alabama |
Sun Belt Conference tournament
| Mar 4, 2007* | (1) | vs. (9) Middle Tennessee; Quarterfinals | L 60–63 | 20–11 | Cajundome (616); Lafayette, Louisiana |
NIT tournament
| Mar 14, 2007* | | at Syracuse; First round | L 73–78 | 20–12 | Carrier Dome (16,832); Syracuse, New York |
*Non-conference game. ^{#}Rankings from AP Poll. (#) Tournament seedings in parentheses. W=West. All times are in Central Time.
