= 2006–07 UCF Golden Knights men's basketball team =

American college basketball season

2006–07 UCF Golden Knights men's basketball
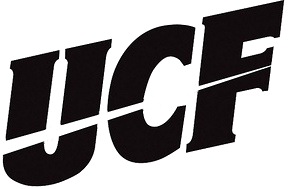

UCF Holiday Classic Champions
- Conference: Conference USA
- Record: 22–9 (11–5 C-USA)
- Head coach: Kirk Speraw
- Assistant coaches: Mike Jaskulski; Craig Brown; Dwight Evans
- Home arena: UCF Arena

2006–07 Conference USA men's basketball standings
	Conf.				Overall
Team	W		L	PCT	W		L	PCT
No. 5 Memphis†	16	–	0	1.000	33	–	4	.892
UCF	11	–	5	.688	22	–	9	.710
Houston	10	–	6	.625	18	–	15	.545
Southern Miss	9	–	7	.563	20	–	11	.645
Tulsa	9	–	7	.563	20	–	11	.645
Tulane	9	–	7	.563	17	–	13	.567
Rice	8	–	8	.500	16	–	16	.500
UAB	7	–	9	.438	15	–	16	.484
Marshall	7	–	9	.438	13	–	19	.406
UTEP	6	–	10	.375	14	–	17	.452
SMU	3	–	13	.188	14	–	17	.452
East Carolina	1	–	15	.063	6	–	24	.200
† 2007 C-USA Tournament winner Rankings from AP Poll

The 2006–07 UCF Golden Knights men's basketball team was an NCAA Division I college basketball team that represented the University of Central Florida and competed in Conference USA. They played their home games at the UCF Arena in Orlando, Florida, and were led by head coach Kirk Speraw, who was in his 14th season with the team. The team went 22-9, 11-5 in C-USA play. In the previous year, the Knights finished the season 14–15, 7–7 in C-USA play. Due to the Knights' turnaround from the previous year, Speraw was named the 2007 Conference USA Coach of the Year.

The 2006–07 season marked the last year that the Knights played in the original UCF Arena, now known as The Venue at UCF. Starting the next season, the team moved into the new UCF Arena.

== Roster ==
2006–07 UCF Knights men's basketball team
Players
Coaches

Pos.	#	Name	Height	Weight	Year	Hometown
G/F	1	Jermaine Taylor	6 ft 4 in (1.93 m)	190 lb (86 kg)	So	Tavares, FL
F	2	Lavell Payne	6 ft 8 in (2.03 m)	210 lb (95 kg)	Sr	Fort Lauderdale, FL
G	3	Dave Noel	6 ft 3 in (1.91 m)	205 lb (93 kg)	Jr	Boynton Beach, FL
G	4	Mike O'Donnell	6 ft 0 in (1.83 m)	185 lb (84 kg)	Jr	Largo, FL
G	5	Chip Cartwright	6 ft 0 in (1.83 m)	160 lb (73 kg)	Jr	Houston, TX
G	10	Drew Speraw (redshirt)	6 ft 2 in (1.88 m)	175 lb (79 kg)	So	Oviedo, FL
G	11	Mike Battle	6 ft 4 in (1.93 m)	205 lb (93 kg)	Jr	Waldorf, MD
G	12	Taylor Young (redshirt)	6 ft 1 in (1.85 m)	185 lb (84 kg)	Fr	Orlando, FL
F	13	Kenrick Zondervan	6 ft 9 in (2.06 m)	215 lb (98 kg)	So	Hoofddorp, Holland
F	20	Tony Davis	6 ft 7 in (2.01 m)	195 lb (88 kg)	Fr	Sarasota, FL
C	21	Stanley Billings	6 ft 11 in (2.11 m)	230 lb (104 kg)	Jr	Orlando, FL
F	22	Andre Thornton	6 ft 6 in (1.98 m)	230 lb (104 kg)	Fr	Memphis, TN
C	25	Adam Gill	6 ft 9 in (2.06 m)	225 lb (102 kg)	Jr	Springboro, OH
F	30	Josh Peppers	6 ft 6 in (1.98 m)	210 lb (95 kg)	Sr	Memphis, TN
F	34	Jacob Loucks	6 ft 7 in (2.01 m)	210 lb (95 kg)	Jr	Clearwater, FL

Head coach

- Kirk Speraw (Iowa)

Assistant coach(es)

- Mike Jaskulski (St. Norbert)
- Craig Brown (Florida)
- Dwight Evans (Birmingham–Southern)

Legend

- (C) Team captain
- (S) Suspended
- (I) Ineligible
- (W) Walk-on
- Injured
- Current redshirt

Roster
Last update: March 2007

== Schedule and results ==
Date time, TV	Rank^{#}	Opponent^{#}	Result	Record	Site city, state
Exhibition
November 9, 2006*; 1:00 pm		St. Leo	W 102–54	1–0	UCF Arena; Orlando, FL
Regular season (non-conference play)
November 15, 2006*; 7:30 pm		Rollins	W 83–80 ^{OT}	1–0	UCF Arena (2,886); Orlando, FL
November 18, 2006*; 7:30 pm		Stetson	W 73–60	2–0	UCF Arena (1,851); Orlando, FL
November 21, 2006*; 7:30 pm		Bethune-Cookman	W 81–46	3–0	UCF Arena (1,829); Orlando, FL
November 24, 2006*; 7:30 pm		Florida Tech	W 81–37	4–0	UCF Arena (1,704); Orlando, FL
November 27, 2006*; 7:30 pm		Jacksonville	W 99–62	5–0	UCF Arena (1,951); Orlando, FL
December 9, 2006*; 7:30 pm		FAU	W 87–65	6–0	UCF Arena (2,879); Orlando, FL
December 12, 2006*; 8:00 pm		at Minnesota	L 63–74	6–1	Williams Arena (10,059); Minneapolis, MN
December 19, 2006*; 2:00 pm		vs. Utah; San Juan Shootout	W 67–61	7–1	Mario Morales Coliseum (750); Guaynabo, PR
December 20, 2006*; 4:00 pm		vs. Appalachian State; San Juan Shootout	L 64–75	7–2	Mario Morales Coliseum (750); Guaynabo, PR
December 21, 2006*; 2:00 pm		vs. Tennessee Tech; San Juan Shootout	W 73–66	8–2	Mario Morales Coliseum (200); Guaynabo, PR
December 29, 2006*; 7:30 pm		New Jersey Tech; UCF Holiday Classic	W 75–63	9–2	UCF Arena (1,725); Orlando, FL
December 30, 2006*; 7:30 pm		Texas-Pan American; UCF Holiday Classic	W 88–62	10–2	UCF Arena (1,688); Orlando, FL
January 3, 2007*; 7:30 pm		at Colorado	L 87–96	10–3	Coors Events Center (2,204); Boulder, CO
January 6, 2007*; 8:00 pm		at South Dakota State	W 72–61	11–3	Frost Arena (1,587); Brookings, SD
Regular season (C-USA conference play)
January 10, 2007; 9:00 pm, CSS		at UAB	L 64–74 ^{OT}	11–4 (0–1)	Bartow Arena (4,817); Birmingham, AL
January 13, 2007; 7:00 pm		at Marshall	W 78–71	12–4 (1–1)	Cam Henderson Center (3,537); Huntington, WV
January 17, 2007; 7:30 pm		SMU	W 64–56	13–4 (2–1)	UCF Arena (3,151); Orlando, FL
January 20, 2007; 7:30 pm		Rice	W 72–67	14–4 (3–1)	UCF Arena (3,807); Orlando, FL
January 24, 2007; 8:00 pm		at Houston	L 70–73 ^{OT}	14–5 (3–2)	Hofheinz Pavilion (3,914); Houston, TX
January 27, 2007; 4:00 pm, CSTV		at UTEP	W 67–64	15–5 (4–2)	Don Haskins Center (9,944); El Paso, TX
January 31, 2007; 7:00 pm, CSS		No. 12 Memphis	L 65–87	15–6 (4–3)	UCF Arena (4,805); Orlando, FL
February 3, 2007; 7:30 pm		Tulsa	W 63–53	16–6 (5–3)	UCF Arena (2,419); Orlando, FL
February 7, 2007; 7:00 pm		at East Carolina	W 67–49	17–6 (6–3)	Williams Arena at Minges Coliseum (3,870); Greenville, NC
February 10, 2007; 12:00 pm, CSS		Marshall	W 75–58	18–6 (7–3)	UCF Arena (2,338); Orlando, FL
February 14, 2007; 8:00 pm		at Tulane	L 80–86	18–7 (7–4)	Avron B. Fogelman Arena (1,563); New Orleans, LA
February 17, 2007; 8:00 pm		at Rice	W 74–63	19–7 (8–4)	Tudor Fieldhouse (1,074); Houston, TX
February 21, 2007; 8:00 pm, CSTV		Southern Miss	W 59–56	20–7 (9–4)	UCF Arena (2,448); Orlando, FL
February 24, 2007; 8:00 pm		at Tulsa	L 64–66 ^{OT}	20–8 (9–5)	Reynolds Center (5,714); Tulsa, OK
February 28, 2007; 7:30 pm		Houston	W 75–72 ^{OT}	21–8 (10–5)	UCF Arena (4,090); Orlando, FL
March 3, 2007; 7:30 pm		East Carolina	W 77–64	22–8 (11–5)	UCF Arena (3,725); Orlando, FL
C-USA tournament
March 8, 2007; 1:00 pm, CSTV		vs. Rice	L 51–53	22–9	FedExForum (8,384); Memphis, TN
*Non-conference game. Rankings from AP poll. All times are in Eastern Time.
