= 2006–07 Memphis Tigers men's basketball team =

American college basketball season

2006–07 Memphis Tigers men's basketball

C-USA Regular Season Champions C-USA tournament champions

NCAA tournament, Elite Eight
- Conference: Conference USA

Ranking
- Coaches: No. 7
- AP: No. 5
- Record: 33–4 (16–0 C-USA)
- Head coach: John Calipari
- Assistant coaches: Derek Kellogg; John Robic; Chuck Martin
- Home arena: FedExForum

2006–07 Conference USA men's basketball standings
	Conf.				Overall
Team	W		L	PCT	W		L	PCT
No. 5 Memphis†	16	–	0	1.000	33	–	4	.892
UCF	11	–	5	.688	22	–	9	.710
Houston	10	–	6	.625	18	–	15	.545
Southern Miss	9	–	7	.563	20	–	11	.645
Tulsa	9	–	7	.563	20	–	11	.645
Tulane	9	–	7	.563	17	–	13	.567
Rice	8	–	8	.500	16	–	16	.500
UAB	7	–	9	.438	15	–	16	.484
Marshall	7	–	9	.438	13	–	19	.406
UTEP	6	–	10	.375	14	–	17	.452
SMU	3	–	13	.188	14	–	17	.452
East Carolina	1	–	15	.063	6	–	24	.200
† 2007 C-USA Tournament winner Rankings from AP Poll

The 2006–07 Memphis Tigers men's basketball team represented the University of Memphis in the 2006–07 college basketball season, the 86th season of Tiger basketball. The Tigers were coached by seventh-year head coach John Calipari, and they played their home games at the FedExForum in Memphis, Tennessee.

== Recruiting ==
College recruiting information
Name	Hometown	School	Height	Weight	Commit date
Hashim Bailey; C	Patterson, NC	The Patterson School	6 ft 10 in (2.08 m)	275 lb (125 kg)	Sep 15, 2005
Hashim Bailey; C	Recruit ratings: Scout: Rivals:				
Willie Kemp; PG	Bolivar, TN	Bolivar Christian Academy	6 ft 2 in (1.88 m)	170 lb (77 kg)	Sep 28, 2005
Willie Kemp; PG	Recruit ratings: Scout: Rivals:				
Doneal Mack; SG	Statesville, NC	Statesville Christian HS	6 ft 5 in (1.96 m)	175 lb (79 kg)	Jul 18, 2006
Doneal Mack; SG	Recruit ratings: Scout: Rivals:				
Pierre Niles; PF	Lake Suzy, FL	Florida Preparatory Academy	6 ft 8 in (2.03 m)	265 lb (120 kg)	Aug 29, 2005
Pierre Niles; PF	Recruit ratings: Scout: Rivals:				
Tre'Von Willis; SG	Fresno, CA	Washington Union HS	6 ft 3 in (1.91 m)	185 lb (84 kg)	Oct 30, 2005
Tre'Von Willis; SG	Recruit ratings: Scout: Rivals:				
Overall recruit ranking: Scout: 25 Rivals: NR
Note: In many cases, Scout, Rivals, 247Sports, On3, and ESPN may conflict in their listings of height and weight.; In these cases, the average was taken. ESPN grades are on a 100-point scale.; Sources: "Memphis Basketball Commitments". Rivals.; "2006 Memphis Basketball Commits". Scout.; "ESPN". ESPN.; "Scout.com Team Recruiting Rankings". Scout.; "2006 Team Ranking". Rivals.

== Roster ==
2006–07 Memphis Tigers men's basketball team
Players
Coaches

Pos.	#	Name	Height	Weight	Year	Hometown
G	15	Andre Allen	5 ft 10 in (1.78 m)	205 lb (93 kg)	Jr	Memphis, Tennessee
G	12	Antonio Anderson	6 ft 6 in (1.98 m)	200 lb (91 kg)	So	Lynn, Massachusetts
F/C	35	Hashim Bailey	6 ft 10 in (2.08 m)	290 lb (132 kg)	Fr	Paterson, New Jersey
C	42	Kareem Cooper	6 ft 11 in (2.11 m)	290 lb (132 kg)	So	Washington, DC
C	32	Joey Dorsey	6 ft 9 in (2.06 m)	260 lb (118 kg)	Jr	Baltimore, Maryland
G	14	Chris Douglas-Roberts	6 ft 6 in (1.98 m)	190 lb (86 kg)	So	Detroit, Michigan
F	2	Robert Dozier	6 ft 9 in (2.06 m)	215 lb (98 kg)	So	Lithonia, Georgia
F	5	Jeremy Hunt	6 ft 5 in (1.96 m)	210 lb (95 kg)	Sr	Memphis, Tennessee
G	1	Willie Kemp	6 ft 2 in (1.88 m)	175 lb (79 kg)	Fr	Bolivar, Tennessee
G	20	Doneal Mack	6 ft 5 in (1.96 m)	170 lb (77 kg)	Fr	Statesville, North Carolina
G	55	Chance McGrady	6 ft 2 in (1.88 m)	180 lb (82 kg)	So	Auburndale, Florida
F	4	Pierre Niles	6 ft 8 in (2.03 m)	285 lb (129 kg)	Fr	Memphis, Tennessee
G	30	Jared Sandridge	6 ft 2 in (1.88 m)	175 lb (79 kg)	Sr	Memphis, Tennessee
F	10	Shawn Taggart	6 ft 10 in (2.08 m)	230 lb (104 kg)	So	Richmond, Virginia
G	0	Clyde Wade	6 ft 0 in (1.83 m)	185 lb (84 kg)	RS Sr	Memphis, Tennessee
G	3	Tre'Von Willis	6 ft 4 in (1.93 m)	200 lb (91 kg)	Fr	Fresno, California

Head coach

- John Calipari (Clarion)

Assistant coach(es)

- Derek Kellogg (UMass)
- Chuck Martin (Monmouth)
- John Robic (Denison)

Legend

- (C) Team captain
- (S) Suspended
- (I) Ineligible
- (W) Walk-on
- Injured
- Current redshirt

Roster
Last update: 2010-04-05

== Schedule ==
Date time, TV	Rank^{#}	Opponent^{#}	Result	Record	Site (attendance) city, state
Regular Season
11/16/06*; 7:00 pm, WLMT	No. 13	Jackson State	W 111–69	1–0	FedExForum (10,207); Memphis, TN
11/20/06*; 1:30 pm, ESPN2	No. 11	vs. Oklahoma; Maui Invitational Tournament	W 77–65	2–0	Lahaina Civic Center (2,400); Maui, HI
11/21/06*; 6:00 pm, ESPN	No. 11	vs. No. 19 Georgia Tech; Maui Invitational Tournament	L 85–92	2–1	Lahaina Civic Center (2,400); Maui, HI
11/22/06*; 3:30 pm, ESPN2	No. 11	vs. No. 22 Kentucky; Maui Invitational Tournament	W 80–63	3–1	Lahaina Civic Center (2,400); Maui, HI
11/29/06*; 7:00 pm, WLMT	No. 17	Arkansas State	W 86–60	4–1	FedExForum (13,713); Memphis, TN
12/02/06*; 12:00 pm, WLMT	No. 17	Manhattan	W 77–59	5–1	FedExForum (15,087); Memphis, TN
12/04/06*; 7:00 pm, WLMT	No. 17	Marshall	W 78–59	6–1 (1–0)	FedExForum (14,183); Memphis, TN
12/06/06*; 8:00 pm, ESPN2	No. 17	at Tennessee	L 58–76	6–2	Thompson-Boling Arena (19,714); Knoxville, TN
12/09/06*; 12:00 pm, CSS	No. 17	Mississippi	W 82–70	7–2	FedExForum (14,315); Memphis, TN
12/14/06*; 8:00 pm, WLMT	No. 19	Austin Peay	W 88–63	8–2	FedExForum (14,538); Memphis, TN
12/20/06*; 7:30 pm, FSN	No. 18	at No. 9 Arizona	L 71–79	8–3	McKale Center (14,568); Tucson, AZ
12/23/06*; 12:00 pm, CSS	No. 18	Middle Tennessee	W 86–46	9–3	FedExForum (14,525); Memphis, TN
12/28/06*; 7:00 pm, WLMT	No. 23	Lamar	W 87–62	10–3	FedExForum (16,154); Memphis, TN
01/04/07; 8:00 pm, ESPN	No. 23	Cincinnati	W 88–55	11–3	FedExForum (16,223); Memphis, TN
01/11/07; 8:00 pm, ESPN	No. 19	at Houston	W 79–69	12–3 (2–0)	Hofheinz Pavilion (4,804); Houston, TX
01/13/07; 7:00 pm, CSS	No. 19	at Southern Miss	W 75–62	13–3 (3–0)	Reed Green Coliseum (5,410); Hattiesburg, MS
01/16/07; 8:00 pm, CSTV	No. 18	UAB	W 79–54	14–3 (4–0)	FedExForum (14,736); Memphis, TN
01/20/07; 5:00 pm, CSTV	No. 18	at East Carolina	W 61–44	15–3 (5–0)	Williams Arena at Minges Coliseum (6,064); Greenville, NC
01/24/07; 8:00 pm, CSS	No. 14	Tulsa	W 72–59	16-3 (6–0)	FedExForum (15,760); Memphis, TN
01/27/07; 12:00 pm, CSS	No. 14	Southern Miss	W 67–64	17–3 (7–0)	FedExForum (14,741); Memphis, TN
01/31/07; 6:00 pm, CSS	No. 12	at UCF	W 87–65	18–3 (8–0)	UCF Arena (4,805); Orlando, FL
02/03/07; 11:00 am, ESPN2	No. 12	SMU	W 88–52	19–3 (9–0)	FedExForum (15,748); Memphis, TN
02/08/07; 8:00 pm, ESPN	No. 10	at UAB	W 70–56	20–3 (10–0)	Bartow Arena (7,453); Birmingham, AL
02/10/07; 7:00 pm, CSS	No. 10	Tulane	W 95–51	21–3 (11–0)	FedExForum (17,176); Memphis, TN
02/14/07; 7:00 pm, CSTV	No. 9	at Tulsa	W 69–52	22–3 (12–0)	Reynolds Center (6,081); Tulsa, OK
02/17/07*; 5:00 pm, ESPN	No. 9	at Gonzaga	W 78–77 ^{OT}	23–3	Spokane Veterans Memorial Arena (11,272); Spokane, WA
02/22/07; 6:00 pm, ESPN	No. 7	Rice	W 99–63	24–3 (13–0)	FedExForum (15,020); Memphis, TN
02/25/07; 1:00 pm, CBS	No. 7	Houston	W 77–64	25–3 (14–0)	FedExForum (16,924); Memphis, TN
03/01/07; 8:00 pm, ESPN2	No. 6	at UTEP	W 78–67	26–3 (15–0)	Don Haskins Center (11,066); El Paso, TX
03/03/07; 8:30 pm, CSTV	No. 6	at SMU	W 64–61	27–3 (16–0)	Moody Coliseum (3,592); Dallas, TX
2007 Conference USA tournament
03/08/07; 6:00 pm, CSTV	No. 5	Marshall; Conference USA Tournament quarterfinals	W 92–71	28–3	FedExForum (10,494); Memphis, TN
03/09/07; 3:30 pm, CSTV	No. 5	Tulane; Conference tournament semifinals	W 71–49	29–3	FedExForum (11,002); Memphis, TN
03/10/07; 10:30 am, CBS	No. 5	Houston; Conference tournament Final	W 71–59	30–3	FedExForum (15,468); Memphis, TN
2007 NCAA tournament
03/16/07*; 11:30 am, CBS	No. 5	vs. North Texas; First Round	W 73–58	31–3	New Orleans Arena (13,393); New Orleans, LA
03/18/07*; 3:45 pm, CBS	No. 5	vs. No. 15 Nevada; Second Round	W 78–62	32–3	New Orleans Arena (13,594); New Orleans, LA
03/22/07*; 6:27 pm, CBS	No. 5	vs. No. 7 Texas A&M; Sweet Sixteen	W 65–64	33–3	Alamodome (26,776); San Antonio, TX
03/24/07*; 3:47 pm, CBS	No. 5	vs. No. 1 Ohio State; Elite Eight	L 76–92	33–4	Alamodome (26,260); San Antonio, TX
*Non-conference game. (#) Tournament seedings in parentheses. All times are in Central Time.
