= 2007 Conference USA men's basketball tournament =

- Tournament logo
- Classification: Division I
- Season: 2006–07
- Teams: 12
- Site: FedExForum; Memphis, Tennessee
- Champions: Memphis (2nd title)
- Winning coach: John Calipari (2nd title)
- Television: CBS College Sports; CBS

2006–07 Conference USA men's basketball standings
	Conf.				Overall
Team	W		L	PCT	W		L	PCT
No. 5 Memphis†	16	–	0	1.000	33	–	4	.892
UCF	11	–	5	.688	22	–	9	.710
Houston	10	–	6	.625	18	–	15	.545
Southern Miss	9	–	7	.563	20	–	11	.645
Tulsa	9	–	7	.563	20	–	11	.645
Tulane	9	–	7	.563	17	–	13	.567
Rice	8	–	8	.500	16	–	16	.500
UAB	7	–	9	.438	15	–	16	.484
Marshall	7	–	9	.438	13	–	19	.406
UTEP	6	–	10	.375	14	–	17	.452
SMU	3	–	13	.188	14	–	17	.452
East Carolina	1	–	15	.063	6	–	24	.200
† 2007 C-USA Tournament winner Rankings from AP Poll

The 2007 Conference USA men's basketball tournament took place March 7–10, 2007, at the FedExForum in Memphis, Tennessee.

== Bracket ==
First round Wednesday, March 7
8	Marshall	53
9	UAB	52
5	Tulsa	65
12	East Carolina	50
7	Rice	77
10	UTEP	74
6	Southern Miss	59
11	SMU	52

Quarterfinals; Thursday, March 8
1	#5 Memphis	92
8	Marshall	71
4	Tulane	58
5	Tulsa	56
2	UCF	51
7	Rice	53
3	Houston	62
6	Southern Miss	59

Semifinals; Friday, March 9
1	#5 Memphis	71
4	Tulane	49
7	Rice	62
3	Houston	77

Final; Saturday, March 10
1	#5 Memphis	71
3	Houston	59

All games held at FedExForum, Memphis, TN
